The following is the individual results for the 2021 Canadian federal election. Following the 2019 election a minority government was formed, increasing the likelihood of an early election call.

Candidates could begin registering with Elections Canada on 17 August; registration closed at 2 p.m. local time on 30 August. The official list of candidates was available on 1 September.

Deputy returning officers report their results to the returning office by phone on election night, then submit written statements. Special ballots (including but not limited to mail-in voting) are counted at each district's returning office beginning the day after the election. Returning officers have seven days to validate the written statement of the deputy returning officer for each poll; most ridings are validated within a week of voting but ridings with remote communities often take longer, with Nunavut taking 17 days in 2021. Six days after completing the validations, the returning officer declares the winner by signing and returning the writ to the Chief Electoral Officer. Ridings undergoing a judicial recount are not subject to the six-day time limit for returning the writ.

Abbreviations guide

Animal – Animal Protection Party of Canada
BQ – Bloc Québécois
Cent. – Centrist Party of Canada
CFF – Canada's Fourth Front
CHP – Christian Heritage Party of Canada
CNP – Canadian Nationalist Party
Comm. – Communist Party of Canada
Conservative – Conservative Party of Canada
FPC – Free Party Canada
Green – Green Party of Canada
Ind. – Independent
Liberal – Liberal Party of Canada
Libert. – Libertarian Party of Canada
Mar. – Marijuana Party
Mav. – Maverick Party
M-L – Marxist–Leninist Party of Canada
NA – No Affiliation
NCA – National Citizens Alliance of Canada
NDP – New Democratic Party
Pat. – Parti Patriote
PIQ – Parti pour l'Indépendance du Québec
PPC – People's Party of Canada
Rhino. – Parti Rhinocéros Party
unreg. – Party not yet eligible for registration with Elections Canada
VCP – Veterans Coalition Party of Canada

Candidates and results
Candidates' names are as registered with Elections Canada.
Vote totals are those validated by Elections Canada; media coverage is usually based on preliminary totals and often differs from the final numbers.

† = not seeking re-election
‡ = running for re-election in different riding
§ = represents that the incumbent was refused nomination by their party
$ = represents that the incumbent was announced as nominated by their party but later chose to retire
# = represents that the incumbent was announced as nominated by their party but later lost that party's nomination through expulsion from caucus

bold indicates party leader

Newfoundland and Labrador

|-
| style="background-color:whitesmoke" |Avalon
||
|Ken McDonald18,60850.10%
|
|Matthew Chapman12,73834.29%
|
|Carolyn Davis5,15113.87%
|
|Lainie Stewart6471.74%
||
|Ken McDonald
|-
| style="background-color:whitesmoke" |Bonavista—Burin—Trinity
||
|Churence Rogers13,97246.59%
|
|Sharon Vokey12,27840.94%
|
|Anne Marie Anonsen2,4848.28%
|
|Linda Hogan1,2574.19%
||
|Churence Rogers
|-
| style="background-color:whitesmoke" |Coast of Bays—Central—Notre Dame 
|
|Scott Simms14,64646.01%
||
|Clifford Small14,92746.89%
|
|Jamie Ruby2,2617.10%
|
|
||
|Scott Simms
|-
| style="background-color:whitesmoke" |Labrador
||
|Yvonne Jones4,11942.67%
|
|Shane Dumaresque2,93030.35%
|
|Amy Norman2,29723.80%
|
|Shannon Champion3073.18%
||
|Yvonne Jones
|-
| style="background-color:whitesmoke" |Long Range Mountains
||
|Gudie Hutchings16,17844.39%
|
|Carol Anstey14,34439.36%
|
|Kaila Mintz4,34711.93%
|
|Darrell Shelley1,5784.33%
||
|Gudie Hutchings
|-
| style="background-color:whitesmoke" |St. John's East
||
|Joanne Thompson17,23945.16%
|
|Glenn Etchegary7,11918.65%
|
|Mary Shortall13,09034.29%
|
|Dana Metcalfe7231.89%
||
|Jack Harris†
|-
| style="background-color:whitesmoke" |St. John's South—Mount Pearl
||
|Seamus O'Regan19,47856.17%
|
|Steve Hodder6,44718.59%
|
|Ray Critch8,11323.40%
|
|Georgia Faith Stewart6381.84%
||
|Seamus O'Regan
|}

Nova Scotia

|-
| style="background-color:whitesmoke" |Cape Breton—Canso
||
|Mike Kelloway18,28846.46%
|
|Fiona MacLeod13,80535.07%
|
|Jana Reddick5,61814.27%
|
|
|
|Brad Grandy1,6494.19%
|
|
||
|Mike Kelloway
|-
|rowspan=3 style="background-color:whitesmoke" |Central Nova
|rowspan=3 |
|rowspan=3 |Sean Fraser18,68246.16%
|rowspan=3 |
|rowspan=3 |Steven Cotter13,06032.27%
|rowspan=3 |
|rowspan=3 |Betsy MacDonald6,22515.38%
|rowspan=3 |
|rowspan=3 |Katerina Nikas4941.22%
|rowspan=3 |
|rowspan=3 |Al Muir1,4453.57%
|
|Chris Frazer (Comm.)138 0.34%
|rowspan=3 |
|rowspan=3 |Sean Fraser
|-
|
|Harvey Henderson (Ind.)365 0.90%
|-
|
|Ryan Smyth (Rhino.)65 0.16%
|-
| style="background-color:whitesmoke" |Cumberland—Colchester
|
|Lenore Zann13,82234.20%
||
|Stephen Ellis18,60146.02%
|
|Daniel Osborne4,98412.33%
|
|Jillian Foster1,0452.59%
|
|Bill Archer1,6874.17%
|
|Jody O'Blenis (Ind.)2780.69%
||
|Lenore Zann
|-
| style="background-color:whitesmoke" |Dartmouth—Cole Harbour
||
|Darren Fisher24,20953.06%
|
|
|
|Kevin Payne15,26733.46%
|
|Rana Zaman1,3713.00%
|
|Michelle Lindsay4,78110.48%
|
|
||
|Darren Fisher
|-
| style="background-color:whitesmoke" |Halifax
||
|Andy Fillmore21,90542.74%
|
|Cameron Ells6,60112.88%
|
|Lisa Roberts20,34739.70%
|
|Jo-Ann Roberts1,1282.20%
|
|B. Alexander Hébert1,0692.09%
|
|Katie Campbell (Comm.)1980.39%
||
|Andy Fillmore
|-
| style="background-color:whitesmoke" |Halifax West
||
|Lena Metlege Diab24,74448.49%
|
|Eleanor Humphries11,24322.03%
|
|Jonathan Keith Roberts12,33124.16%
|
|Richard Zurawski1,1812.31%
|
|Julie Scott1,4472.84%
|
|Kevin Schulthies (CHP)850.17%
||
|Geoff Regan†
|-
| style="background-color:whitesmoke" |Kings—Hants
||
|Kody Blois20,19244.92%
|
|Mark Parent13,23429.44%
|
|Stephen Schneider8,64519.23%
|
|Sheila G. Richardson9402.09%
|
|Steven Ford1,9454.33%
|
|
||
|Kody Blois
|-
| style="background-color:whitesmoke" |Sackville—Preston—Chezzetcook
||
|Darrell Samson18,83841.31%
|
|Angela Conrad12,04726.42%
|
|Jenna Chisholm12,01226.34%
|
|Anthony Edmonds9332.05%
|
|Earl Gosse1,7763.89%
|
|
||
|Darrell Samson
|-
| style="background-color:whitesmoke" |South Shore—St. Margarets
|
|Bernadette Jordan18,57537.15%
||
|Rick Perkins20,45440.90%
|
|Olivia Dorey9,54119.08%
|
|Thomas Trappenberg1,4342.87%
|
|
|
|
||
|Bernadette Jordan
|-
| style="background-color:whitesmoke" |Sydney—Victoria
||
|Jaime Battiste14,25039.24%
|
|Eddie Orrell13,16636.26%
|
|Jeff Ward7,21719.87%
|
|Mark Embrett3761.04%
|
|Ronald Angus Barron1,1763.24%
|
|Nikki Boisvert (M-L)1270.35%
||
|Jaime Battiste
|-
| style="background-color:whitesmoke" |West Nova
|
|Alxys Chamberlain13,73231.30%
||
|Chris d'Entremont22,10450.38%
|
|Cheryl Burbidge5,64512.87%
|
|
|
|Scott Spidle2,3905.45%
|
|
||
|Chris d'Entremont
|}

Prince Edward Island

|-
| style="background-color:whitesmoke" |Cardigan
||
|Lawrence MacAulay11,17550.58%
|
|Wayne Phelan6,81730.85%
|
|Lynne Thiele2,1689.81%
|
|Michael MacLean1,0644.82%
|
|Kevin Hardy7253.28%
|
|Fred MacLeod1450.66%
||
|Lawrence MacAulay
|-
| style="background-color:whitesmoke" |Charlottetown
||
|Sean Casey8,91946.70%
|
|Doug Currie5,93231.06%
|
|Margaret Andrade2,04810.72%
|
|Darcie Lanthier1,8329.59%
|
|Scott McPhee3691.93%
|
|
||
|Sean Casey
|-
| style="background-color:whitesmoke" |Egmont
||
|Bobby Morrissey9,04046.21%
|
|Barry Balsom6,08831.12%
|
|Lisa Bradshaw1,6888.63%
|
|Alex Clark1,7719.05%
|
|Wayne Biggar9744.98%
|
|
||
|Bobby Morrissey
|-
| style="background-color:whitesmoke" |Malpeque
||
|Heath MacDonald9,91241.81%
|
|Jody Sanderson7,83633.05%
|
|Michelle Neill1,8988.01%
|
|Anna Keenan3,38114.26%
|
|Christopher Landry6802.87%
|
|
||
|Wayne Easter†
|}

New Brunswick

|-
| style="background-color:whitesmoke" |Acadie—Bathurst
||
|Serge Cormier27,81764.81%
|
|Jean-Paul Lanteigne5,91613.78%
|
|Mélissa Hébert4,90611.43%
|
|Rachel Johns1,2032.80%
|
|Kenneth Edward Langford2,5315.90%
|
|Richer Doiron (FPC)5491.28%
||
|Serge Cormier
|-
| style="background-color:whitesmoke" |Beauséjour
||
|Dominic LeBlanc27,31355.58%
|
|Shelly Mitchell9,52619.38%
|
|Evelyne Godfrey5,39410.98%
|
|Stella Anna Girouard2,7985.69%
|
|Jack Minor3,7237.58%
|
|Isabelle Sauriol Chiasson (FPC)3910.80%
||
|Dominic LeBlanc
|-
|rowspan=3 style="background-color:whitesmoke" |Fredericton
|rowspan=3 |
|rowspan=3 |Jenica Atwin16,31637.03%
|rowspan=3 |
|rowspan=3 |Andrea Johnson15,81435.89%
|rowspan=3 |
|rowspan=3 |Shawn Oldenburg5,56412.63%
|rowspan=3 |
|rowspan=3 |Nicole O'Byrne5,66612.86%
|rowspan=3 |
|rowspan=3 |
|
|Brandon Kirby (Libert.)234 0.53%
|rowspan=3 |
|rowspan=3 |Jenica Atwin
|-
|
|June Patterson (Comm.)158 0.36%
|-
|
|Jen Smith (Ind.)310 0.70%
|-
| style="background-color:whitesmoke" |Fundy Royal
|
|Whitney Dykeman11,07524.95%
||
|Rob Moore21,46048.35%
|
|Josh Floyd6,21113.99%
|
|Tim Thompson2,1894.93%
|
|Wayne Wheeler3,4477.77%
|
|
||
|Rob Moore
|-
| style="background-color:whitesmoke" |Madawaska—Restigouche
||
|René Arseneault16,85455.18%
|
|Shawn Beaulieu7,89225.84%
|
|Elizabeth MacDonald1,8486.05%
|
|Rebecca Blaevoet7862.57%
|
|Nancy Mercier1,8896.18%
|
|Louis Berube (FPC)1,2774.18%
||
|René Arseneault
|-
| style="background-color:whitesmoke" |Miramichi—Grand Lake
|
|Lisa Harris12,76239.26%
||
|Jake Stewart14,21843.74%
|
|Bruce Potter2,2917.05%
|
|Patty Deitch1,3934.29%
|
|Ron Nowlan1,8395.66%
|
|
||
|Pat Finnigan$
|-
| style="background-color:whitesmoke" |Moncton—Riverview—Dieppe
||
|Ginette Petitpas Taylor22,46049.08%
|
|Darlene Smith10,69223.36%
|
|Serge Landry7,77416.99%
|
|Richard Dunn1,9354.23%
|
|Lorilee Carrier2,9016.34%
|
|
||
|Ginette Petitpas Taylor
|-
| style="background-color:whitesmoke" |New Brunswick Southwest
|
|Jason Hickey8,75023.89%
||
|John Williamson18,30949.98%
|
|Richard Trevor Warren4,89313.36%
|
|John Reist1,5874.33%
|
|Meryl Sarty3,0908.44%
|
|
||
|John Williamson
|-
| style="background-color:whitesmoke" |Saint John—Rothesay
||
|Wayne Long17,37546.40%
|
|Mel Norton12,31532.88%
|
|Don Paulin4,81612.86%
|
|Ann McAllister9482.53%
|
|Nicholas Pereira1,9965.33%
|
|
||
|Wayne Long
|-
| style="background-color:whitesmoke" |Tobique—Mactaquac
|
|Cully Robinson8,22323.90%
||
|Richard Bragdon17,53650.98%
|
|Meriet Gray Miller3,65610.63%
|
|Anthony Martin1,6574.82%
|
|Daniel Joseph Waggoner2,9308.52%
|
|Steven J LaForest (Ind.)3981.16%
||
|Richard Bragdon
|}

Quebec

Eastern Quebec

|-
| style="background-color:whitesmoke" |Avignon—La Mitis—Matane—Matapédia
|
|Louis-Éric Savoie7,09521.45%
|
|Germain Dumas2,9128.80%
||
|Kristina Michaud19,77659.79%
|
|Christel Marchand1,5014.54%
|
|Eric Barnabé9652.92%
|
|Mélanie Gendron8262.50%
|
|
||
|Kristina Michaud
|-
|rowspan=2 style="background-color:whitesmoke" |Bellechasse—Les Etchemins—Lévis
|rowspan=2 |
|rowspan=2 |Daniel Vaillancourt10,07415.94%
|rowspan=2 |
|rowspan=2 |Dominique Vien32,23851.02%
|rowspan=2 |
|rowspan=2 |Marie-Christine Richard14,66923.22%
|rowspan=2 |
|rowspan=2 |Marie-Philippe Gagnon Gauthier3,1845.04%
|rowspan=2 |
|rowspan=2 |
|rowspan=2 |
|rowspan=2 |Raymond Arcand1,7932.84%
|
|Chamroeun Khuon (Ind.)306 0.48%
|rowspan=2 |
|rowspan=2 |Steven Blaney$
|-
|
|Hélène Lefebvre (Green)918 1.45%
|-
| style="background-color:whitesmoke" |Gaspésie—Les Îles-de-la-Madeleine
||
|Diane Lebouthillier17,09946.39%
|
|Jean-Pierre Pigeon3,0108.17%
|
|Guy Bernatchez14,48139.29%
|
|Lisa Phung1,3583.68%
|
|Christian Rioux6211.68%
|
|Monique Leduc2890.78%
|
|
||
|Diane Lebouthillier
|-
| style="background-color:whitesmoke" |Montmagny—L'Islet—Kamouraska—Rivière-du-Loup
|
|François Lapointe8,36117.49%
||
|Bernard Généreux24,11850.44%
|
|Simon Bérubé12,55026.25%
|
|Sean English1,5973.34%
|
|
|
|Nancy Rochon9171.92%
|
|Thibaud Mony (Rhino.)2690.56%
||
|Bernard Généreux
|-
|rowspan=2 style="background-color:whitesmoke" |Rimouski-Neigette—Témiscouata—Les Basques
|rowspan=2 |
|rowspan=2 |Léonie Lajoie10,48224.88%
|rowspan=2 |
|rowspan=2 |France Gagnon5,56913.22%
|rowspan=2 |
|rowspan=2 |Maxime Blanchette-Joncas20,65749.02%
|rowspan=2 |
|rowspan=2 |Sylvain Lajoie2,6416.27%
|rowspan=2 |
|rowspan=2 |Jean Tardy7001.66%
|rowspan=2 |
|rowspan=2 |Michel Raymond4301.02%
|
|Noémi Bureau-Civil (Ind.)1,467 3.48%
|rowspan=2 |
|rowspan=2 |Maxime Blanchette-Joncas
|-
|
|Megan Hodges (Rhino.)192 0.46%
|}

Côte-Nord and Saguenay

|-
|rowspan=3 style="background-color:whitesmoke" |Beauport—Côte-de-Beaupré—Île d'Orléans—Charlevoix
|rowspan=3 |
|rowspan=3 |Alexandra Bernier10,36520.67%
|rowspan=3 |
|rowspan=3 |Véronique Laprise15,96931.85%
|rowspan=3 |
|rowspan=3 |Caroline Desbiens19,27038.44%
|rowspan=3 |
|rowspan=3 |Frédéric Du Verle2,2424.47%
|rowspan=3 |
|rowspan=3 |Frédéric Amyot7331.46%
|
|Chantal Laplante (FPC)449 0.90%
|rowspan=3 |
|rowspan=3 |Caroline Desbiens
|-
|
|Jenniefer Lefrançois (PPC)881 1.76%
|-
|
|Vicky Lépine (Ind.)227 0.45%
|-
| style="background-color:whitesmoke" |Chicoutimi—Le Fjord
|
|Jean Duplain7,67618.27%
||
|Richard Martel17,22841.01%
|
|Julie Bouchard14,02733.39%
|
|Ismaël Raymond1,9444.63%
|
|Yves Laporte4821.15%
|
|Jimmy Voyer (PPC)6491.55%
||
|Richard Martel
|-
| style="background-color:whitesmoke" |Jonquière
|
|Stéphane Bégin9,54620.99%
|
|Louise Gravel13,22329.08%
||
|Mario Simard19,03641.86%
|
|Marieve Ruel2,5595.63%
|
|Marie-Josée Yelle7381.62%
|
|Line Bélanger (Rhino.)3720.82%
||
|Mario Simard
|-
| style="background-color:whitesmoke" |Lac-Saint-Jean
|
|Marjolaine Étienne9,37118.67%
|
|Serge Bergeron12,89925.70%
||
|Alexis Brunelle-Duceppe25,46650.73%
|
|Mathieu Chambers1,6373.26%
|
|Annie Thibault8241.64%
|
|
||
|Alexis Brunelle-Duceppe
|-
| style="background-color:whitesmoke" |Manicouagan
|
|Thomas Gagné6,54518.70%
|
|Rodrigue Vigneault7,64021.83%
||
|Marilène Gill18,41952.63%
|
|Nichola St-Jean1,5094.31%
|
|
|
|Bianca Girard (FPC)8872.53%
||
|Marilène Gill
|}

Quebec City

|-
| style="background-color:whitesmoke" |Beauport—Limoilou
|
|Ann Gingras12,37825.45%
|
|Alupa Clarke14,16429.12%
||
|Julie Vignola15,14631.14%
|
|Camille Esther Garon5,07510.43%
|
|Dalila Elhak1,0252.11%
|
|
|
|Lyne Verret7371.52%
|
|Claude Moreau (M-L)1190.24%
||
|Julie Vignola
|-
| style="background-color:whitesmoke" |Charlesbourg—Haute-Saint-Charles
|
|René-Paul Coly11,32619.75%
||
|Pierre Paul-Hus25,62344.68%
|
|Marie-Christine Lamontagne14,23724.83%
|
|Michel Marc Lacroix3,4466.01%
|
|Jacques Palardy-Dion9721.69%
|
|Wayne Cyr1,2962.26%
|
|Daniel Pelletier4490.78%
|
|
||
|Pierre Paul-Hus
|-
| style="background-color:whitesmoke" |Louis-Hébert
||
|Joël Lightbound22,93338.35%
|
|Gilles Lépine14,33223.97%
|
|Marc Dean16,24727.17%
|
|Hamid Nadji4,3377.25%
|
|Denis Blanchette1,5732.63%
|
|
|
|
|
|Ali Dahan (Ind.)3780.63%
||
|Joël Lightbound
|-
| style="background-color:whitesmoke" |Louis-Saint-Laurent
|
|Nathanielle Morin11,22817.52%
||
|Gérard Deltell33,09851.64%
|
|Thierry Bilodeau13,06920.39%
|
|Yu-Ti Eva Huang3,3705.26%
|
|Daniel Chicoine9071.42%
|
|Guillaume Côté1,3372.09%
|
|Mélanie Fortin1,0891.70%
|
|
||
|Gérard Deltell
|-
| style="background-color:whitesmoke" |Québec
||
|Jean-Yves Duclos18,13235.42%
|
|Bianca Boutin9,23918.05%
|
|Louis Sansfaçon14,82428.96%
|
|Tommy Bureau6,65212.99%
|
|Patrick Kerr1,1822.31%
|
|Daniel Brisson8551.67%
|
|Karine Simard3070.60%
|
|
||
|Jean-Yves Duclos
|}

Central Quebec

|-
| style="background-color:whitesmoke" |Bécancour—Nicolet—Saurel
|
|Nathalie Rochefort8,45116.90%
|
|Yanick Caisse8,40416.81%
||
|Louis Plamondon27,40354.80%
|
|Catherine Gauvin2,5505.10%
|
|David Turcotte7701.54%
|
|Eric Pettersen1,2142.43%
|
|André Blanchette1,2152.43%
|
|
||
|Louis Plamondon
|-
| style="background-color:whitesmoke" |Berthier—Maskinongé
|
|Alexandre Bellemare8,40315.29%
|
|Léo Soulières6,00710.93%
||
|Yves Perron19,33935.20%
|
|Ruth Ellen Brosseau18,40233.49%
|
|Laurence Requilé5481.00%
|
|Geneviève Sénécal1,4962.72%
|
|Denis Brown5511.00%
|
|Steven Lamirande (Mar.)1990.36%
||
|Yves Perron
|-
| style="background-color:whitesmoke" |Joliette
|
|Michel Bourgeois12,73122.65%
|
|Roger Materne5,3149.46%
||
|Gabriel Ste-Marie30,91355.01%
|
|Alexis Beaudet3,1005.52%
|
|Érica Poirier1,1262.00%
|
|Maxime Leclerc1,7713.15%
|
|Manon Coutu9921.77%
|
|Yanick Théoret (Mar.)2510.45%
||
|Gabriel Ste-Marie
|-
| style="background-color:whitesmoke" |Lévis—Lotbinière
|
|Ghislain Daigle9,28614.65%
||
|Jacques Gourde32,73151.62%
|
|Samuel Lamarche13,74021.67%
|
|Guylaine Dumont4,4977.09%
|
|Charles-Eugène Bergeron8561.35%
|
|Benoit Simard1,6612.62%
|
|Mariève Lemay5410.85%
|
|Carl Brochu (Pat.)950.15%
||
|Jacques Gourde
|-
| style="background-color:whitesmoke" |Montcalm
|
|Javeria Qureshi10,19619.82%
|
|Gisèle Desroches6,01111.68%
||
|Luc Thériault27,37853.21%
|
|Oulai B. Goué3,2186.25%
|
|Mathieu Goyette1,3172.56%
|
|Bruno Beaudry2,2584.39%
|
|Robert Bellerose1,0742.09%
|
|
||
|Luc Thériault
|-
| style="background-color:whitesmoke" |Portneuf—Jacques-Cartier
|
|Sani Diallo10,06815.44%
||
|Joël Godin33,65751.61%
|
|Christian Hébert15,52523.81%
|
|David-Roger Gagnon3,2234.94%
|
|
|
|Nash Mathieu1,6152.48%
|
|Charles Fiset6380.98%
|
|Tommy Pelletier (Rhino.)4900.75%
||
|Joël Godin
|-
| style="background-color:whitesmoke" |Repentigny
|
|Yvelie Kernizan16,50027.64%
|
|Pascal Bapfou Vozang Siewe5,3288.92%
||
|Monique Pauzé30,84851.67%
|
|Naomie Mathieu Chauvette4,4847.51%
|
|
|
|
|
|Pierre Duval2,0253.39%
|
|Micheline Boucher Granger (PIQ)5160.86%
||
|Monique Pauzé
|-
|rowspan=3 style="background-color:whitesmoke" |Saint-Maurice—Champlain
|rowspan=3 |
|rowspan=3 |François-Philippe Champagne23,91342.45%
|rowspan=3 |
|rowspan=3 |Jacques Bouchard10,13918.00%
|rowspan=3 |
|rowspan=3 |Jacynthe Bruneau16,94030.07%
|rowspan=3 |
|rowspan=3 |Valérie Bergeron2,8495.06%
|rowspan=3 |
|rowspan=3 |Marie-Claude Gaudet7311.30%
|rowspan=3 |
|rowspan=3 |
|rowspan=3 |
|rowspan=3 |Marie Gabrielle Rouleau9321.65%
|
|Hugo Beaumont Tremblay (Mar.)307 0.54%
|rowspan=3 |
|rowspan=3 |François-Philippe Champagne
|-
|
|Dji-Pé Frazer (Rhino.)285 0.51%
|-
|
|Alain Magnan (Ind.)241 0.43%
|-
| style="background-color:whitesmoke" |Trois-Rivières(judicial recount result)
|
|Martin Francoeur16,63728.63%
|
|Yves Levesque17,05329.35%
||
|René Villemure17,13629.49%
|
|Adis Simidzija4,6808.05%
|
|Andrew Holman7541.30%
|
|Jean Landry1,1151.92%
|
|Gilles Brodeur7351.26%
|
|
||
|Louise Charbonneau†
|}

Eastern Townships

|-
| style="background-color:whitesmoke" |Beauce
|
|Philippe-Alexandre Langlois7,01812.32%
||
|Richard Lehoux27,51448.29%
|
|Solange Thibodeau8,64415.17%
|
|François Jacques-Côté1,6542.90%
|
|Andrzej Wisniowski4860.85%
|
|Maxime Bernier10,36218.19%
|
|Chantale Giguère1,0961.92%
|
|Sébastien Tanguay (Mar.)2060.36%
||
|Richard Lehoux
|-
|rowspan=3 style="background-color:whitesmoke" |Brome—Missisquoi(judicial recount terminated)
|rowspan=3 |
|rowspan=3 |Pascale St-Onge21,48834.96%
|rowspan=3 |
|rowspan=3 |Vincent Duhamel9,96116.20%
|rowspan=3 |
|rowspan=3 |Marilou Alarie21,29134.64%
|rowspan=3 |
|rowspan=3 |Andrew Panton3,8286.23%
|rowspan=3 |
|rowspan=3 |Michelle Corcos1,4662.38%
|rowspan=3 |
|rowspan=3 |Alexis Stogowski1,9823.22%
|rowspan=3 |
|rowspan=3 |Maryse Richard9611.56%
|
|Lawrence Cotton (VCP)216 0.35%
|rowspan=3 |
|rowspan=3 |Lyne Bessette$
|-
|
|Dany Desjardins (Ind.)145 0.24%
|-
|
|Susanne Lefebvre (CHP)133 0.22%
|-
| style="background-color:whitesmoke" |Compton—Stanstead
||
|Marie-Claude Bibeau21,18836.66%
|
|Pierre Tremblay10,08717.45%
|
|Nathalie Bresse17,68130.59%
|
|Geneva Allen4,2887.42%
|
|Sylvain Dodier1,6232.81%
|
|Yves Bourassa2,1673.75%
|
|Déitane Gendron5761.00%
|
|Sylvain Longpré (Ind.)1860.32%
||
|Marie-Claude Bibeau
|-
|rowspan=2 style="background-color:whitesmoke" |Drummond
|rowspan=2 |
|rowspan=2 |Mustapha Berri9,61418.78%
|rowspan=2 |
|rowspan=2 |Nathalie Clermont9,17917.93%
|rowspan=2 |
|rowspan=2 |Martin Champoux23,86646.62%
|rowspan=2 |
|rowspan=2 |François Choquette5,70911.15%
|rowspan=2 |
|rowspan=2 |
|rowspan=2 |
|rowspan=2 |
|rowspan=2 |
|rowspan=2 |Josée Joyal1,7283.38%
|
|Sylvain Marcoux (NA)419 0.82%
|rowspan=2 |
|rowspan=2 |Martin Champoux
|-
|
|Lucas Munger (Animal)674 1.32%
|-
| style="background-color:whitesmoke" |Mégantic—L'Érable
|
|Adam Lukofsky6,32913.63%
||
|Luc Berthold26,12156.26%
|
|Éric Labonté9,31820.07%
|
|Mathieu Boisvert1,3082.82%
|
|Emilie Hamel5921.28%
|
|Jonathan Gagnon1,6773.61%
|
|Real Pepin6801.46%
|
|Gloriane Blais (Ind.)4030.87%
||
|Luc Berthold
|-
| style="background-color:whitesmoke" |Richmond—Arthabaska
|
|Alexandre Desmarais8,54314.95%
||
|Alain Rayes28,51349.88%
|
|Diego Scalzo14,15024.76%
|
|Nataël Bureau2,5504.46%
|
|
|
|Nadine Fougeron2,0583.60%
|
|Louis Richard8971.57%
|
|Marjolaine Delisle (Rhino.)4480.78%
||
|Alain Rayes
|-
| style="background-color:whitesmoke" |Saint-Hyacinthe—Bagot
|
|Caroline-Joan Boucher12,03022.68%
|
|André Lepage7,16613.51%
||
|Simon-Pierre Savard-Tremblay25,16547.45%
|
|Brigitte Sansoucy6,17011.63%
|
|
|
|Sylvain Pariseau1,4452.72%
|
|Sébastien Desautels1,0551.99%
|
|
||
|Simon-Pierre Savard-Tremblay
|-
|rowspan=2 style="background-color:whitesmoke" |Shefford
|rowspan=2 |
|rowspan=2 |Pierre Breton19,96833.49%
|rowspan=2 |
|rowspan=2 |Céline Lalancette7,23412.13%
|rowspan=2 |
|rowspan=2 |Andréanne Larouche24,99741.92%
|rowspan=2 |
|rowspan=2 |Patrick Jasmin3,1735.32%
|rowspan=2 |
|rowspan=2 |Mathieu Morin1,0591.78%
|rowspan=2 |
|rowspan=2 |Gerda Schieder2,0733.48%
|rowspan=2 |
|rowspan=2 |Joël Lacroix5991.00%
|
|Jean-Philippe Beaudry-Graham (PIQ)239 0.40%
|rowspan=2 |
|rowspan=2 |Andréanne Larouche
|-
|
|Yannick Brisebois (Mar.)284 0.48%
|-
| style="background-color:whitesmoke" |Sherbrooke
||
|Élisabeth Brière21,83037.52%
|
|Andrea Winters7,49012.87%
|
|Ensaf Haidar16,84828.96%
|
|Marika Lalime8,10713.93%
|
|Marie-Clarisse Berger1,6702.87%
|
|Marcela Niculescu1,4532.50%
|
|Maxime Boivin7871.35%
|
|
||
|Élisabeth Brière
|}

Montérégie

|-
|rowspan=3 style="background-color:whitesmoke" |Beloeil—Chambly
|rowspan=3 |
|rowspan=3 |Marie-Chantal Hamel15,50223.73%
|rowspan=3 |
|rowspan=3 |Stéphane Robichaud5,6618.67%
|rowspan=3 |
|rowspan=3 |Yves-François Blanchet34,67853.09%
|rowspan=3 |
|rowspan=3 |Marie-Josée Béliveau5,5248.46%
|rowspan=3 |
|rowspan=3 |Fabrice Gélinas Larrain1,2941.98%
|rowspan=3 |
|rowspan=3 |Danila Ejov1,3162.01%
|rowspan=3 |
|rowspan=3 |Mario Grimard8101.24%
|
|Michel Blondin (PIQ)163 0.25%
|rowspan=3 |
|rowspan=3 |Yves-Francois Blanchet
|-
|
|Thomas Thibault-Vincent (Rhino.)185 0.28%
|-
|
|Benjamin Vachon (Mar.)191 0.29%
|-
| style="background-color:whitesmoke" |Brossard—Saint-Lambert
||
|Alexandra Mendès28,32654.10%
|
|Marcos Alves6,27611.99%
|
|Marie-Laurence Desgagné10,44119.94%
|
|Marc Audet5,44210.39%
|
|
|
|Brenda Ross1,2882.46%
|
|Engineer-Ingénieur Hu5831.11%
|
|
||
|Alexandra Mendès
|-
| style="background-color:whitesmoke" |Châteauguay—Lacolle(judicial recount result)
||
|Brenda Shanahan18,02937.03%
|
|Pierre Bournaki5,53811.38%
|
|Patrick O'Hara18,01737.01%
|
|Hannah Wolker3,7527.71%
|
|Frédéric Olivier8011.65%
|
|Jeff Benoit1,8213.74%
|
|André Lafrance4480.92%
|
|Marc Gagnon (PIQ)2770.57%
||
|Brenda Shanahan
|-
| style="background-color:whitesmoke" |La Prairie
|
|Caroline Desrochers20,47034.61%
|
|Lise des Greniers5,8789.94%
||
|Alain Therrien25,86243.73%
|
|Victoria Hernandez4,3177.30%
|
|Barbara Joannette9831.66%
|
|Ruth Fontaine1,5322.59%
|
|
|
|Normand Chouinard (M-L)980.17%
||
|Alain Therrien
|-
| style="background-color:whitesmoke" |Longueuil—Charles-LeMoyne
||
|Sherry Romanado19,40040.44%
|
|Isabelle Lalonde3,9868.31%
|
|Nathalie Boisclair16,92635.28%
|
|Kalden Dhatsenpa4,95710.33%
|
|Nancy Cardin1,1702.44%
|
|Tiny Olinga1,4092.94%
|
|
|
|Pierre Chénier (M-L)1220.25%
||
|Sherry Romanado
|-
| style="background-color:whitesmoke" |Longueuil—Saint-Hubert
|
|Florence Gagnon21,93038.32%
|
|Boukare Tall3,9646.93%
||
|Denis Trudel23,57941.20%
|
|Mildred Murray4,5537.95%
|
|Simon King1,5992.79%
|
|Manon Girard1,3582.37%
|
|
|
|Jacinthe Lafrenaye (PIQ)2520.44%
||
|Denis Trudel
|-
| style="background-color:whitesmoke" |Montarville
|
|Marie-Ève Pelchat19,97434.75%
|
|Julie Sauvageau5,4609.50%
||
|Stéphane Bergeron26,01145.26%
|
|Djaouida Sellah4,8098.37%
|
|
|
|Natasha Hynes1,2182.12%
|
|
|
|
||
|Stéphane Bergeron
|-
| style="background-color:whitesmoke" |Pierre-Boucher—Les Patriotes—Verchères
|
|Louis-Gabriel Girard14,28225.85%
|
|Jérôme Painchaud4,8708.82%
||
|Xavier Barsalou-Duval29,97854.26%
|
|Martin Leprohon4,2617.71%
|
|
|
|Alexandre Blais1,0781.95%
|
|Carole Boisvert7771.41%
|
|
||
|Xavier Barsalou-Duval
|-
| style="background-color:whitesmoke" |Saint-Jean
|
|Jean Rioux16,65028.12%
|
|Serge Benoit7,54412.74%
||
|Christine Normandin27,24346.01%
|
|Jeremy Fournier4,3087.28%
|
|Leigh V. Ryan1,2622.13%
|
|
|
|Jean-Charles Cléroux1,7903.02%
|
|Pierre Duteau (PIQ)4130.70%
||
|Christine Normandin
|-
| style="background-color:whitesmoke" |Salaberry—Suroît
|
|Linda Gallant16,55027.19%
|
|Jean Collette7,47612.28%
||
|Claude Debellefeuille29,09347.80%
|
|Joan Gottman4,5297.44%
|
|
|
|Nicolas Thivierge2,2073.63%
|
|Marcel Goyette5610.92%
|
|Luc Bertrand (PIQ)4490.74%
||
|Claude DeBellefeuille
|-
| style="background-color:whitesmoke" |Vaudreuil—Soulanges
||
|Peter Schiefke30,00146.47%
|
|Karen Cox10,55616.35%
|
|Thierry Vadnais-Lapierre14,30822.16%
|
|Niklas Brake6,78010.50%
|
|Cameron Stiff1,6312.53%
|
|
|
|Ginette Destrempes1,2881.99%
|
|
||
|Peter Schiefke
|}

Northern Montreal and Laval

|-
| style="background-color:whitesmoke" |Ahuntsic-Cartierville
||
|Mélanie Joly26,40252.38%
|
|Steven Duarte4,2478.43%
|
|Anna Simonyan11,11222.04%
|
|Ghada Chaabi5,84411.59%
|
|Luc Joli-Coeur1,4912.96%
|
|Manon Chevalier1,3132.60%
|
|
||
|Mélanie Joly
|-
| style="background-color:whitesmoke" |Alfred-Pellan
||
|Angelo Iacono24,51647.83%
|
|Angiolino D'Anello6,98813.63%
|
|Isabel Dion13,39926.14%
|
|Cindy Mercer3,9467.70%
|
|Pierre-Alexandre Corneillet9401.83%
|
|
|
|Dwayne Cappelletti (FPC)1,4672.86%
||
|Angelo Iacono
|-
| style="background-color:whitesmoke" |Bourassa
||
|Emmanuel Dubourg22,30360.39%
|
|Ilyasa Sykes2,5877.00%
|
|Ardo Dia6,90718.70%
|
|Nicholas Ponari2,9568.00%
|
|Nathe Perrone6791.84%
|
|Michel Lavoie1,3493.65%
|
|Michel Prairie (Ind.)1510.41%
||
|Emmanuel Dubourg
|-
| style="background-color:whitesmoke" |Laval—Les Îles
||
|Fayçal El-Khoury24,75848.93%
|
|Spyridonas Pettas8,96317.71%
|
|Guillaume Jolivet9,65619.08%
|
|Rowan Woodmass3,8897.69%
|
|Ahmed Taleb7601.50%
|
|Matthieu Couture2,5715.08%
|
|
||
|Fayçal El-Khoury
|-
| style="background-color:whitesmoke" |Marc-Aurèle-Fortin
||
|Yves Robillard22,99244.11%
|
|Sarah Petrari6,12011.74%
|
|Manon D. Lacharité16,05530.80%
|
|Ali Faour4,4618.56%
|
|
|
|Louis Léger1,5092.89%
|
|Micheline Flibotte (FPC)9901.90%
||
|Yves Robillard
|-
|rowspan=4 style="background-color:whitesmoke" |Papineau
|rowspan=4 |
|rowspan=4 |Justin Trudeau22,84850.30%
|rowspan=4 |
|rowspan=4 |Julio Rivera2,1984.84%
|rowspan=4 |
|rowspan=4 |Nabila Ben Youssef6,83015.04%
|rowspan=4 |
|rowspan=4 |Christine Paré10,30322.68%
|rowspan=4 |
|rowspan=4 |Alain Lepine1,4483.19%
|rowspan=4 |
|rowspan=4 |Christian Boutin1,0642.34%
|
|Garnet Colly (M-L)115 0.25%
|rowspan=4 |
|rowspan=4 |Justin Trudeau
|-
|
|Raymond Martin (Ind.)102 0.22%
|-
|
|Béatrice Zako (Ind.)97 0.21%
|-
|
|Above Znoneofthe (Rhino.)418 0.92%
|-
| style="background-color:whitesmoke" |Saint-Léonard—Saint-Michel
||
|Patricia Lattanzio29,01069.38%
|
|Louis Ialenti4,38110.48%
|
|Laurence Massey3,3958.12%
|
|Alicia Di Tullio3,4608.27%
|
|
|
|Daniele Ritacca1,5683.75%
|
|
||
|Patricia Lattanzio
|-
| style="background-color:whitesmoke" |Vimy
||
|Annie Koutrakis25,31649.77%
|
|Rima El-Helou6,82913.43%
|
|Rachid Bandou11,81123.22%
|
|Vassif Aliev4,7319.30%
|
|
|
|Alejandro Morales-Loaiza2,1754.28%
|
|
||
|Annie Koutrakis
|}

Eastern Montreal

|-
|rowspan=2 style="background-color:whitesmoke" |Hochelaga
|rowspan=2 |
|rowspan=2 |Soraya Martinez Ferrada18,19738.14%
|rowspan=2 |
|rowspan=2 |Aime Calle Cabrera2,2214.66%
|rowspan=2 |
|rowspan=2 |Simon Marchand15,08931.63%
|rowspan=2 |
|rowspan=2 |Catheryn Roy-Goyette9,72320.38%
|rowspan=2 |
|rowspan=2 |Zachary Lavarenne9652.02%
|rowspan=2 |
|rowspan=2 |Marc-André Doucet-Beauchamp1,0812.27%
|rowspan=2 |
|rowspan=2 |Christine Dandenault840.18%
|
|Michelle Paquette (Comm.)108 0.23%
|rowspan=2 |
|rowspan=2 |Soraya Martinez Ferrada
|-
|
|Alan Smithee (Rhino.)238 0.50%
|-
| style="background-color:whitesmoke" |Honoré-Mercier
||
|Pablo Rodriguez29,03359.97%
|
|Guy Croteau5,08610.51%
|
|Charlotte Lévesque-Marin7,90816.34%
|
|Paulina Ayala3,5377.31%
|
|Bianca Deltorto-Russell7341.52%
|
|Lucilia Miranda2,0234.18%
|
|Yves Le Seigle880.18%
|
|
||
|Pablo Rodríguez
|-
|rowspan=2 style="background-color:whitesmoke" |La Pointe-de-l'Île
|rowspan=2 |
|rowspan=2 |Jonas Fadeu16,50832.32%
|rowspan=2 |
|rowspan=2 |Massimo Anania3,4276.71%
|rowspan=2 |
|rowspan=2 |Mario Beaulieu23,83546.66%
|rowspan=2 |
|rowspan=2 |Alexandre Vallerand4,9549.70%
|rowspan=2 |
|rowspan=2 |
|rowspan=2 |
|rowspan=2 |Jonathan Desclin1,3992.74%
|rowspan=2 |
|rowspan=2 |Genevieve Royer1590.31%
|
|Agnès Falquet (FPC)577 1.13%
|rowspan=2 |
|rowspan=2 |Mario Beaulieu
|-
|
|Charles Phillippe Gervais (PIQ)221 0.43%
|-
|rowspan=4 style="background-color:whitesmoke" |Laurier—Sainte-Marie
|rowspan=4 |
|rowspan=4 |Steven Guilbeault16,96137.96%
|rowspan=4 |
|rowspan=4 |Ronan Reich1,5003.36%
|rowspan=4 |
|rowspan=4 |Marie-Eve-Lyne Michel9,11420.40%
|rowspan=4 |
|rowspan=4 |Nimâ Machouf14,68032.86%
|rowspan=4 |
|rowspan=4 |Jean-Michel Lavarenne9922.22%
|rowspan=4 |
|rowspan=4 |Daniel Tanguay7581.70%
|rowspan=4 |
|rowspan=4 |Serge Lachapelle700.16%
|
|Cyril Julien (Ind.)74 0.17%
|rowspan=4 |
|rowspan=4 |Steven Guilbeault
|-
|
|Kimberly Lamontagne (Animal)199 0.45%
|-
|
|Julie Morin (FPC)233 0.52%
|-
|
|Adrien Welsh (Comm.)95 0.21%
|-
| style="background-color:whitesmoke" |Rosemont—La Petite-Patrie
|
|Nancy Drolet12,73823.17%
|
|Surelys Perez Hernandez2,1994.00%
|
|Shophika Vaithyanathasarma11,75121.37%
||
|Alexandre Boulerice26,70848.57%
|
|Franco Fiori1,3082.38%
|
|
|
|Gisèle Desrochers2840.52%
|
|
||
|Alexandre Boulerice
|}

Western Montreal

|-
| style="background-color:whitesmoke" |Dorval—Lachine—LaSalle
||
|Anju Dhillon25,23352.41%
|
|Jude Bazelais5,75411.95%
|
|Cloé Rose Jenneau7,54215.67%
|
|Fabiola Ngamaleu Teumeni6,24112.96%
|
|Laura Mariani1,3512.81%
|
|Michael Patterson2,0204.20%
|
|
||
|Anju Dhillon
|-
| style="background-color:whitesmoke" |Lac-Saint-Louis
||
|Francis Scarpaleggia32,47756.26%
|
|Ann Francis10,91118.90%
|
|Rémi Lebeuf3,0785.33%
|
|Jonathan Gray7,67913.30%
|
|Milan Kona-Mancini1,8683.24%
|
|Afia Lassy1,7122.97%
|
|
||
|Francis Scarpaleggia
|-
|rowspan=2 style="background-color:whitesmoke" |LaSalle—Émard—Verdun
|rowspan=2 |
|rowspan=2 |David Lametti20,33042.93%
|rowspan=2 |
|rowspan=2 |Janina Moran3,5307.45%
|rowspan=2 |
|rowspan=2 |Raphaël Guérard10,46122.09%
|rowspan=2 |
|rowspan=2 |Jason De Lierre9,16819.36%
|rowspan=2 |
|rowspan=2 |Sarah Carter1,4393.04%
|rowspan=2 |
|rowspan=2 |Michel Walsh1,6003.38%
|
|Pascal Antonin (FPC)636 1.34%
|rowspan=2 |
|rowspan=2 |David Lametti
|-
|
|JP Fortin (Comm.)196 0.41%
|-
| style="background-color:whitesmoke" |Mount Royal
||
|Anthony Housefather23,28457.69%
|
|Frank Cavallaro9,88924.50%
|
|Yegor Komarov1,5853.93%
|
|Ibrahim Bruno El-Khoury3,3818.38%
|
|Clement Badra1,0832.68%
|
|Zachary Lozoff1,0512.60%
|
|Diane Johnston (M-L)890.22%
||
|Anthony Housefather
|-
|rowspan=2 style="background-color:whitesmoke" |Notre-Dame-de-Grâce—Westmount
|rowspan=2 |
|rowspan=2 |Marc Garneau24,51053.76%
|rowspan=2 |
|rowspan=2 |Mathew Kaminski6,41214.06%
|rowspan=2 |
|rowspan=2 |Jordan Craig Larouche2,4075.28%
|rowspan=2 |
|rowspan=2 |Emma Elbourne-Weinstock8,75319.20%
|rowspan=2 |
|rowspan=2 |Sam Fairbrother1,8354.02%
|rowspan=2 |
|rowspan=2 |David Freiheit1,4983.29%
|
|Rachel Hoffman (M-L)117 0.26%
|rowspan=2 |
|rowspan=2 |Marc Garneau
|-
|
|Geofryde Wandji (CHP)59 0.13%
|-
| style="background-color:whitesmoke" |Outremont
||
|Rachel Bendayan16,71445.39%
|
|Jasmine Louras2,8827.83%
|
|Célia Grimard5,53515.03%
|
|Ève Péclet9,57926.02%
|
|Grace Tarabey1,1983.25%
|
|Yehuda Pinto8192.22%
|
|Angela-Angie Joshi (Ind.)930.25%
||
|Rachel Bendayan
|-
| style="background-color:whitesmoke" |Pierrefonds—Dollard
||
|Sameer Zuberi29,29656.01%
|
|Terry Roberts10,89320.83%
|
|Nadia Bourque4,1417.92%
|
|Maninderjit Kaur Tumbar6,03411.54%
|
|
|
|Mark Sibthorpe1,9423.71%
|
|
||
|Sameer Zuberi
|-
| style="background-color:whitesmoke" |Saint-Laurent
||
|Emmanuella Lambropoulos22,05659.10%
|
|Richard Serour6,90218.50%
|
|Florence Racicot2,9727.96%
|
|Nathan Devereaux4,05910.88%
|
|
|
|Gregory Yablunovsky1,1823.17%
|
|Ginette Boutet (M-L)1460.39%
||
|Emmanuella Lambropoulos
|-
|rowspan=2 style="background-color:whitesmoke" |Ville-Marie—Le Sud-Ouest—Île-des-Sœurs
|rowspan=2 |
|rowspan=2 |Marc Miller24,97850.54%
|rowspan=2 |
|rowspan=2 |Steve Shanahan6,13812.42%
|rowspan=2 |
|rowspan=2 |Soledad Orihuela-Bouchard6,17612.50%
|rowspan=2 |
|rowspan=2 |Sophie Thiébaut9,24118.70%
|rowspan=2 |
|rowspan=2 |Cynthia Charbonneau-Lavictoire1,3432.72%
|rowspan=2 |
|rowspan=2 |Denise Dubé1,2912.61%
|
|Linda Sullivan (M-L)122 0.25%
|rowspan=2 |
|-
|
|Hans Armando Vargas (Mar.)134 0.27%
|Marc Miller
|}

Laurentides, Outaouais and Northern Quebec

|-
| style="background-color:whitesmoke" |Abitibi—Baie-James—Nunavik—Eeyou
|
|Lise Kistabish7,38425.97%
|
|Steve Corriveau4,50815.85%
||
|Sylvie Bérubé10,78437.92%
|
|Pauline Lameboy3,32311.69%
|
|Didier Pilon4421.55%
|
|Michaël Cloutier1,0723.77%
|
|Cédric Brazeau5942.09%
|
|Jimmy Levesque (Mar.)3291.16%
||
|Sylvie Bérubé
|-
| style="background-color:whitesmoke" |Abitibi—Témiscamingue
|
|William Legault-Lacasse11,01324.11%
|
|Luis Henry Gonzalez Venegas5,33911.69%
||
|Sébastien Lemire23,12050.61%
|
|Bethany Stewart2,7946.12%
|
|Martin Chartrand7481.64%
|
|Eric Lacroix1,5383.37%
|
|Dany Goulet8581.88%
|
|Joël Lirette (Rhino.)2750.60%
||
|Sébastien Lemire
|-
| style="background-color:whitesmoke" |Argenteuil—La Petite-Nation
||
|Stéphane Lauzon19,37138.27%
|
|Marie Louis-Seize6,54712.94%
|
|Yves Destroismaisons17,84235.25%
|
|Michel Welt3,3906.70%
|
|
|
|Marc Vachon2,7775.49%
|
|Paul Lynes6861.36%
|
|
||
|Stéphane Lauzon
|-
|rowspan=2 style="background-color:whitesmoke" |Gatineau
|rowspan=2 |
|rowspan=2 |Steven MacKinnon26,26750.04%
|rowspan=2 |
|rowspan=2 |Joel E. Bernard5,75210.96%
|rowspan=2 |
|rowspan=2 |Geneviève Nadeau12,27823.39%
|rowspan=2 |
|rowspan=2 |Fernanda Rengel4,5088.59%
|rowspan=2 |
|rowspan=2 |Rachid Jemmah7831.49%
|rowspan=2 |
|rowspan=2 |Mathieu Saint-Jean2,2644.31%
|rowspan=2 |
|rowspan=2 |Luc Lavoie4110.78%
|
|Sébastien Grenier (Rhino.)178 0.34%
|rowspan=2 |
|rowspan=2 |Steven MacKinnon
|-
|
|Pierre Soublière (M-L)56 0.11%
|-
|rowspan=2 style="background-color:whitesmoke" |Hull—Aylmer
|rowspan=2 |
|rowspan=2 |Greg Fergus26,89252.47%
|rowspan=2 |
|rowspan=2 |Sandrine Perion5,50710.75%
|rowspan=2 |
|rowspan=2 |Simon Provost8,32316.24%
|rowspan=2 |
|rowspan=2 |Samuel Gendron6,48312.65%
|rowspan=2 |
|rowspan=2 |Simon Gnocchini-Messier1,4592.85%
|rowspan=2 |
|rowspan=2 |Eric Fleury1,8643.64%
|rowspan=2 |
|rowspan=2 |Josée Lafleur3750.73%
|
|Catherine Dickins (Ind.)143 0.28%
|rowspan=2 |
|rowspan=2 |Greg Fergus
|-
|
|Mike LeBlanc (Rhino.)203 0.40%
|-
| style="background-color:whitesmoke" |Laurentides—Labelle
|
|Antoine Menassa15,96624.90%
|
|Kathy Laframboise6,77010.56%
||
|Marie-Hélène Gaudreau32,13350.11%
|
|Eric-Abel Baland3,9076.09%
|
|Michel Le Comte1,5702.45%
|
|Richard Evanko2,4323.79%
|
|Michel Leclerc1,1651.82%
|
|Jean-Noël Sorel (Ind.)1800.28%
||
|Marie-Hélène Gaudreau
|-
| style="background-color:whitesmoke" |Mirabel
|
|François Loza14,84223.52%
|
|Catherine Lefebvre8,51013.48%
||
|Jean-Denis Garon29,37646.55%
|
|Benoit Bourassa5,2218.27%
|
|Mario Guay1,4122.24%
|
|Christian Montpetit2,5694.07%
|
|Ariane Croteau1,1821.87%
|
|
||
|Simon Marcil†
|-
| style="background-color:whitesmoke" |Pontiac
||
|Sophie Chatel26,89943.38%
|
|Michel Gauthier12,80420.65%
|
|Gabrielle Desjardins10,42416.81%
|
|Denise Giroux6,82411.01%
|
|Shaughn McArthur1,7112.76%
|
|David Bruce Gottfred2,8134.54%
|
|Geneviève Labonté-Chartrand4800.77%
|
|James McNair (CFF)520.08%
||
|Will Amos†
|-
|rowspan=2 style="background-color:whitesmoke" |Rivière-des-Mille-Îles
|rowspan=2 |
|rowspan=2 |Linda Lapointe18,83535.29%
|rowspan=2 |
|rowspan=2 |Marc Duffy-Vincelette5,47910.27%
|rowspan=2 |
|rowspan=2 |Luc Desilets21,64540.56%
|rowspan=2 |
|rowspan=2 |Joseph Hakizimana3,8527.22%
|rowspan=2 |
|rowspan=2 |Alec Ware9721.82%
|rowspan=2 |
|rowspan=2 |Hans Roker Jr1,4682.75%
|rowspan=2 |
|rowspan=2 |Valérie Beauséjour8471.59%
|
|Julius Bute (PIQ)119 0.22%
|rowspan=2 |
|rowspan=2 |Luc Desilets
|-
|
|Michael Dionne (Pat.)149 0.28%
|-
|rowspan=2 style="background-color:whitesmoke" |Rivière-du-Nord
|rowspan=2 |
|rowspan=2 |Theodora Bajkin12,76722.27%
|rowspan=2 |
|rowspan=2 |Patricia Morrissette6,80311.87%
|rowspan=2 |
|rowspan=2 |Rhéal Fortin29,94352.23%
|rowspan=2 |
|rowspan=2 |Mary-Helen Paspaliaris3,9586.90%
|rowspan=2 |
|rowspan=2 |
|rowspan=2 |
|rowspan=2 |Keeyan Ravanshid2,1643.77%
|rowspan=2 |
|rowspan=2 |Marie-Eve Damour1,0361.81%
|
|Jean-François René (Rhino.)373 0.65%
|rowspan=2 |
|rowspan=2 |Rhéal Fortin
|-
|
|Nicolas Riqueur-Lainé (PIQ)285 0.50%
|-
| style="background-color:whitesmoke" |Terrebonne
|
|Eric Forget17,47529.64%
|
|Frédérick Desjardins6,18310.49%
||
|Nathalie Sinclair-Desgagné24,27041.17%
|
|Luke Mayba3,9136.64%
|
|David 8471.44%
|
|Louis Stinziani1,5942.70%
|
|Nathan Fortin-Dubé8031.36%
|
|Michel Boudrias (NA)3,8646.55%
||
|Michel Boudrias§
|-
| style="background-color:whitesmoke" |Thérèse-De Blainville
|
|Ramez Ayoub18,39635.18%
|
|Marc Bissonnette5,77311.04%
||
|Louise Chabot21,52641.17%
|
|Julienne Soumaoro3,8277.32%
|
|Simon Paré-Poupart1,0181.95%
|
|Vincent Aubé1,3862.65%
|
|Peggy Tassignon3620.69%
|
|
||
|Louise Chabot
|}

Ontario

Ottawa

|-
| style="background-color:whitesmoke" |Carleton
|
|Gustave Roy24,29834.28%
||
|Pierre Poilievre35,35649.89%
|
|Kevin Hua8,16411.52%
|
|Nira Dookeran1,3271.87%
|
|Peter Crawley1,7282.44%
|
|
||
|Pierre Poilievre
|-
| style="background-color:whitesmoke" |Kanata—Carleton
||
|Jenna Sudds26,39441.79%
|
|Jennifer McAndrew24,37338.59%
|
|Melissa Coenraad8,82213.97%
|
|Jennifer Purdy1,7092.71%
|
|Scott Miller1,8582.94%
|
|
||
|Karen McCrimmon$
|-
| style="background-color:whitesmoke" |Nepean
||
|Chandra Arya29,62045.05%
|
|Matt Triemstra22,18433.74%
|
|Sean Devine10,78616.41%
|
|Gordon Kubanek1,3182.00%
|
|Jay Nera1,8402.80%
|
|
||
|Chandra Arya
|-
| style="background-color:whitesmoke" |Orléans
||
|Marie-France Lalonde39,10151.94%
|
|Mary-Elsie Wolfe21,70028.82%
|
|Jessica Joanis10,98314.59%
|
|Michael Hartnett1,2331.64%
|
|Spencer Oklobdzija2,0462.72%
|
|André Junior Cléroux (FPC)2200.29%
||
|Marie-France Lalonde
|-
|rowspan=3 style="background-color:whitesmoke" |Ottawa Centre
|rowspan=3 |
|rowspan=3 |Yasir Naqvi33,82545.50%
|rowspan=3 |
|rowspan=3 |Carol Clemenhagen11,65015.67%
|rowspan=3 |
|rowspan=3 |Angella MacEwen24,55233.03%
|rowspan=3 |
|rowspan=3 |Angela Keller-Herzog2,1152.84%
|rowspan=3 |
|rowspan=3 |Regina Watteel1,6052.16%
|
|Shelby Bertrand (Animal)261 0.35%
|rowspan=3 |
|rowspan=3 |Catherine McKenna$
|-
|
|Richard "Rich" Joyal (Ind.)132 0.18%
|-
|
|Alex McDonald (Comm.)201 0.27%
|-
| style="background-color:whitesmoke" |Ottawa South
||
|David McGuinty29,03848.81%
|
|Eli Tannis15,49726.05%
|
|Huda Mukbil11,51419.35%
|
|Les Schram1,4012.35%
|
|Chylow Hall1,8983.19%
|
|Larry Wasslen (Comm.)1440.24%
||
|David McGuinty
|-
|rowspan=3 style="background-color:whitesmoke" |Ottawa—Vanier
|rowspan=3 |
|rowspan=3 |Mona Fortier28,46249.05%
|rowspan=3 |
|rowspan=3 |Heidi Jensen11,61120.01%
|rowspan=3 |
|rowspan=3 |Lyse-Pascale Inamuco13,70323.61%
|rowspan=3 |
|rowspan=3 |Christian Proulx1,8163.13%
|rowspan=3 |
|rowspan=3 |Jean-Jacques Desgranges1,8553.20%
|
|Crystelle Bourguignon (FPC)179 0.31%
|rowspan=3 |
|rowspan=3 |Mona Fortier
|-
|
|Daniel Elford (Libert.)248 0.43%
|-
|
|Marie-Chantal TaiEl Leriche (Ind.)157 0.27%
|-
| style="background-color:whitesmoke" |Ottawa West—Nepean
||
|Anita Vandenbeld25,88945.10%
|
|Jennifer Jennekens16,47328.70%
|
|Yavar Hameed11,16319.45%
|
|David Stibbe1,6422.86%
|
|David Yeo1,9083.32%
|
|Sean Mulligan (CHP)3270.57%
||
|Anita Vandenbeld
|}

Eastern Ontario

|-
| style="background-color:whitesmoke" |Bay of Quinte
|
|Neil Ellis22,54236.53%
||
|Ryan Williams25,47941.29%
|
|Stephanie Bell9,28415.05%
|
|Erica Charlton1,3502.19%
|
|Janine LeClerc3,0454.94%
|
|
||
|Neil Ellis
|-
|rowspan=2 style="background-color:whitesmoke" |Glengarry—Prescott—Russell
|rowspan=2 |
|rowspan=2 |Francis Drouin30,36246.07%
|rowspan=2 |
|rowspan=2 |Susan McArthur21,97933.35%
|rowspan=2 |
|rowspan=2 |Konstantine Malakos7,02210.65%
|rowspan=2 |
|rowspan=2 |Daniel Lapierre1,3502.05%
|rowspan=2 |
|rowspan=2 |Brennan Austring4,4586.76%
|
|Marc Bisaillon (FPC)422 0.64%
|rowspan=2 |
|rowspan=2 |Francis Drouin
|-
|
|The Joker (Ind.)314 0.48%
|-
| style="background-color:whitesmoke" |Hastings—Lennox and Addington
|
|Mike Bossio19,05634.86%
||
|Shelby Kramp-Neuman24,65145.09%
|
|Matilda DeBues6,02011.01%
|
|Reg Wilson9711.78%
|
|James Babcock3,1315.73%
|
|Jennifer Sloan (Ind.)8381.53%
||
|Derek Sloan#‡(running in Banff—Airdrie)
|-
| style="background-color:whitesmoke" |Kingston and the Islands
||
|Mark Gerretsen27,72441.07%
|
|Gary Oosterhof16,01923.73%
|
|Vic Sahai19,77529.29%
|
|Waji Khan1,6732.48%
|
|Shelley Sayle-Udall2,3143.43%
|
|
||
|Mark Gerretsen
|-
| style="background-color:whitesmoke" |Lanark—Frontenac—Kingston
|
|Michelle Foxton16,61726.41%
||
|Scott Reid30,76148.90%
|
|Steve Garrison9,82815.62%
|
|Calvin Neufeld1,6642.65%
|
|Florian Bors3,8306.09%
|
|Blake Hamilton (Rhino.)2110.34%
||
|Scott Reid
|-
| style="background-color:whitesmoke" |Leeds—Grenville—Thousand Islands and Rideau Lakes
|
|Roberta L Abbott14,93525.20%
||
|Michael Barrett29,95050.53%
|
|Michelle Taylor8,86314.95%
|
|Lorraine Rekmans2,1343.60%
|
|Alex Cassell3,3945.73%
|
|
||
|Michael Barrett
|-
| style="background-color:whitesmoke" |Renfrew—Nipissing—Pembroke
|
|Cyndi Mills11,33519.37%
||
|Cheryl Gallant28,96749.50%
|
|Jodie Primeau12,26320.96%
|
|Michael Lariviere1,1111.90%
|
|David Ainsworth4,4697.64%
|
|Stefan Klietsch (Ind.)3730.64%
||
|Cheryl Gallant
|-
| style="background-color:whitesmoke" |Stormont—Dundas—South Glengarry
|
|Denis Moquin12,44323.63%
||
|Eric Duncan29,25555.56%
|
|Trevor Kennedy5,80411.02%
|
|Jeanie Warnock1,2302.34%
|
|David Anber3,9217.45%
|
|
||
|Eric Duncan
|}

Central Ontario

|-
| style="background-color:whitesmoke" | Barrie—Innisfil
|
|Lisa-Marie Wilson15,29228.89%
||
|John Brassard25,23447.67%
|
|Aleesha Gostkowski8,34915.77%
|
|
|
|Corrado Brancato4,0607.67%
|
|
||
|John Brassard
|-
| style="background-color:whitesmoke" | Barrie—Springwater—Oro-Medonte
|
|Tanya Saari16,14530.91%
||
|Doug Shipley23,55545.09%
|
|Sarah Lochhead8,91017.06%
|
|
|
|Chris Webb3,6296.95%
|
|
||
|Doug Shipley
|-
| style="background-color:whitesmoke" |Bruce—Grey—Owen Sound
|
|Anne Marie Watson14,73825.23%
||
|Alex Ruff28,72749.18%
|
|Christopher Neudorf7,93913.59%
|
|Ashley Michelle Lawrence1,7893.06%
|
|Anna-Marie Fosbrooke4,6978.04%
|
|Reima Kaikkonen (Ind.)5240.90%
||
|Alex Ruff
|-
| style="background-color:whitesmoke" |Dufferin—Caledon
|
|Lisa Post19,86730.30%
||
|Kyle Seeback31,49048.02%
|
|Samantha Sanchez6,86610.47%
|
|Jenni Michelle Le Forestier2,7544.20%
|
|Anthony Zambito4,3896.69%
|
|Stephen McKendrick (Ind.)2070.32%
||
|Kyle Seeback
|-
| style="background-color:whitesmoke" |Haliburton—Kawartha Lakes—Brock
|
|Judi Forbes15,64523.10%
||
|Jamie Schmale35,41852.30%
|
|Zac Miller9,73014.37%
|
|Angel Godsoe1,6962.50%
|
|Alison Davidson4,7697.04%
|
|Gene Balfour (Libert.)4630.68%
||
|Jamie Schmale
|-
| style="background-color:whitesmoke" |Northumberland—Peterborough South
|
|Alison Lester23,33633.46%
||
|Philip Lawrence31,01544.47%
|
|Kim McArthur-Jackson9,80914.07%
|
|Christina Wilson1,7642.53%
|
|Nathan Lang3,8135.47%
|
|
||
|Philip Lawrence
|-
| style="background-color:whitesmoke" |Peterborough—Kawartha
|
|Maryam Monsef24,66435.13%
||
|Michelle Ferreri27,40239.03%
|
|Joy Lachica13,30218.95%
|
|Chanté White1,5532.21%
|
|Paul Lawton3,0734.38%
|
|Robert M. Bowers (Ind.)2180.31%
||
|Maryam Monsef
|-
| style="background-color:whitesmoke" |Simcoe—Grey
|
|Bren Munro21,32027.83%
||
|Terry Dowdall36,24947.32%
|
|Lucas Gillies10,14013.24%
|
|Nicholas Clayton2,9693.88%
|
|Adam Minatel5,5507.24%
|
|Ken Stouffer (CHP)3820.50%
||
|Terry Dowdall
|-
| style="background-color:whitesmoke" |Simcoe North
|
|Cynthia Wesley-Esquimaux19,33230.39%
||
|Adam Chambers27,38343.05%
|
|Janet-Lynne Durnford9,95815.66%
|
|Krystal Brooks1,9032.99%
|
|Stephen Makk4,8227.58%
|
|Russ Emo (CHP)2100.33%
||
|Bruce Stanton†
|-
| style="background-color:whitesmoke" |York—Simcoe
|
|Daniella Johnson14,46929.04%
||
|Scot Davidson24,90049.97%
|
|Benjamin Jenkins6,80013.65%
|
|
|
|Michael Lotter3,6627.35%
|
|
||
|Scot Davidson
|}

Durham and York

|-
| style="background-color:whitesmoke" |Ajax
||
|Mark Holland28,27956.83%
|
|Arshad Awan13,23726.60%
|
|Monique Hughes6,98814.04%
|
|Leigh Paulseth1,2542.52%
|
|
|
|
||
|Mark Holland
|-
| style="background-color:whitesmoke" |Aurora—Oak Ridges—Richmond Hill
||
|Leah Taylor Roy20,76445.24%
|
|Leona Alleslev19,30442.06%
|
|Janice Hagan3,5947.83%
|
|
|
|Anthony Siskos1,7343.78%
|
|Serge Korovitsyn (Libert.)5001.09%
||
|Leona Alleslev
|-
|rowspan=3 style="background-color:whitesmoke" |Durham
|rowspan=3 |
|rowspan=3 |Jonathan Giancroce20,26729.92%
|rowspan=3 |
|rowspan=3 |Erin O'Toole31,42346.39%
|rowspan=3 |
|rowspan=3 |Chris Cameron11,86517.52%
|rowspan=3 |
|rowspan=3 |
|rowspan=3 |
|rowspan=3 |Patricia Conlin3,7255.50%
|
|Sarah Gabrielle Baron (Ind.)251 0.37%
|rowspan=3 |
|rowspan=3 |Erin O'Toole
|-
|
|Kurdil-Telt Patch (Ind.)49 0.07%
|-
|
|Adam Smith (Rhino.)150 0.22%
|-
| style="background-color:whitesmoke" |King—Vaughan
|
|Deb Schulte21,45842.92%
||
|Anna Roberts22,53445.07%
|
|Sandra Lozano3,2346.47%
|
|Roberta Herod6201.24%
|
|Gilmar Oprisan2,1494.30%
|
|
||
|Deb Schulte
|-
| style="background-color:whitesmoke" |Markham—Stouffville
||
|Helena Jaczek29,77350.99%
|
|Ben Smith20,74035.52%
|
|Muhammad Ahsin Sahi4,9618.50%
|
|Uzair Baig1,0491.80%
|
|René De Vries1,8693.20%
|
|
||
|Helena Jaczek
|-
| style="background-color:whitesmoke" |Markham—Thornhill
||
|Mary Ng23,70961.54%
|
|Melissa Felian10,13626.31%
|
|Paul Sahbaz3,2228.36%
|
|Mimi Lee8132.11%
|
|Ilia Pashaev6481.68%
|
|
||
|Mary Ng
|-
| style="background-color:whitesmoke" |Markham—Unionville
||
|Paul Chiang21,95848.55%
|
|Bob Saroya18,95941.92%
|
|Aftab Qureshi3,0016.64%
|
|Elvin Kao1,3062.89%
|
|
|
|
||
|Bob Saroya
|-
| style="background-color:whitesmoke" |Newmarket—Aurora
||
|Tony Van Bynen24,20843.78%
|
|Harold Kim21,17338.29%
|
|Yvonne Kelly6,33811.46%
|
|Tim Flemming1,0151.84%
|
|Andre Gagnon2,2964.15%
|
|Dorian Baxter (Ind.)2600.47%
||
|Tony Van Bynen
|-
| style="background-color:whitesmoke" |Oshawa
|
|Afroza Hossain13,04423.12%
||
|Colin Carrie22,40939.71%
|
|Shailene Panylo16,07928.50%
|
|Sonny Mir8641.53%
|
|Darryl Mackie4,0297.14%
|
|
||
|Colin Carrie
|-
| style="background-color:whitesmoke" |Pickering—Uxbridge
||
|Jennifer O'Connell27,27146.88%
|
|Jacob Mantle20,97636.06%
|
|Eileen Higdon7,59213.05%
|
|
|
|Corneliu Chisu2,3284.00%
|
|
||
|Jennifer O'Connell
|-
|rowspan=2 style="background-color:whitesmoke" |Richmond Hill
|rowspan=2 |
|rowspan=2 |Majid Jowhari21,78447.71%
|rowspan=2 |
|rowspan=2 |Costas Menegakis17,71538.80%
|rowspan=2 |
|rowspan=2 |Adam DeVita3,9958.75%
|rowspan=2 |
|rowspan=2 |
|rowspan=2 |
|rowspan=2 |Igor Tvorogov1,3632.98%
|
|Charity DiPaola (Ind.)619 1.36%
|rowspan=2 |
|rowspan=2 |Majid Jowhari
|-
|
|Angelika Keller (Ind.)186 0.41%
|-
| style="background-color:whitesmoke" |Thornhill
|
|Gary Gladstone18,16836.29%
||
|Melissa Lantsman25,68751.31%
|
|Raz Razvi3,0416.07%
|
|Daniella Mikanovsky8441.69%
|
|Samuel Greenfield2,3224.64%
|
|
||
|Peter Kent†
|-
| style="background-color:whitesmoke" |Vaughan—Woodbridge
||
|Francesco Sorbara21,69946.01%
|
|Angela Panacci19,01940.33%
|
|Peter Michael DeVita3,2656.92%
|
|Muhammad Hassan Khan4530.96%
|
|Mario Greco2,5675.44%
|
|Luca Mele (Ind.)1590.34%
||
|Francesco Sorbara
|-
| style="background-color:whitesmoke" |Whitby
||
|Ryan Turnbull27,37544.11%
|
|Maleeha Shahid22,27135.88%
|
|Brian Dias8,76614.12%
|
|Johannes Kotilainen9721.57%
|
|Thomas Androvic2,6824.32%
|
|
||
|Ryan Turnbull
|}

Suburban Toronto

|-
| style="background-color:whitesmoke" |Don Valley East
||
|Michael Coteau22,35659.90%
|
|Penelope Williams8,76623.49%
|
|Simon Topp4,61812.37%
|
|Peter De Marco1,5854.25%
|
|
||
|Yasmin Ratansi†
|-
| style="background-color:whitesmoke" |Don Valley North
||
|Han Dong22,06754.44%
|
|Sabrina Zuniga12,09829.85%
|
|Bruce Griffin4,30410.62%
|
|Jay Sobel1,3013.21%
|
|Natalie Telfer (Green)7651.89%
||
|Han Dong
|-
| style="background-color:whitesmoke" |Etobicoke Centre
||
|Yvan Baker27,63548.02%
|
|Geoffrey Turner20,10834.94%
|
|Ashley 5,80410.09%
|
|Maurice Cormier4,0036.96%
|
|
||
|Yvan Baker
|-
|rowspan=3 style="background-color:whitesmoke" |Etobicoke—Lakeshore
|rowspan=3 |
|rowspan=3 |James Maloney30,35547.38%
|rowspan=3 |
|rowspan=3 |Indira Bains20,45731.93%
|rowspan=3 |
|rowspan=3 |Sasha Kane8,77513.70%
|rowspan=3 |
|rowspan=3 |Bill McLachlan2,8574.46%
|
|Sean Carson (Rhino.)119 0.19%
|rowspan=3 |
|rowspan=3 |James Maloney
|-
|
|Anna Di Carlo (M-L)139 0.22%
|-
|
|Afam Elue (Green)1,363 2.13%
|-
| style="background-color:whitesmoke" |Etobicoke North
||
|Kirsty Duncan21,20159.61%
|
|Priti Lamba8,86624.93%
|
|Cecil Peter3,70810.43%
|
|Jim Boutsikakis1,4734.14%
|
|Carol Royer (Ind.)3160.89%
||
|Kirsty Duncan
|-
|rowspan=2 style="background-color:whitesmoke" |Humber River—Black Creek
|rowspan=2 |
|rowspan=2 |Judy Sgro19,53360.69%
|rowspan=2 |
|rowspan=2 |Rinku Shah5,59917.40%
|rowspan=2 |
|rowspan=2 |Matias de Dovitiis5,27916.40%
|rowspan=2 |
|rowspan=2 |Raatib Anderson1,2583.91%
|
|Christine Nugent (M-L)130 0.40%
|rowspan=2 |
|rowspan=2 |Judy Sgro
|-
|
|Unblind Tibbin (Green)388 1.21%
|-
| style="background-color:whitesmoke" |Scarborough—Agincourt
||
|Jean Yip20,71256.54%
|
|Mark Johnson10,63029.02%
|
|Larisa Julius3,67910.04%
|
|Eric Muraven9782.67%
|
|Arjun Balasingham (Green)6311.72%
||
|Jean Yip
|-
| style="background-color:whitesmoke" |Scarborough Centre
||
|Salma Zahid23,12857.59%
|
|Malcolm Ponnayan9,81924.45%
|
|Faiz Kamal5,47913.64%
|
|Petru Rozoveanu1,4723.67%
|
|Aylwin T Mathew (NCA)2630.65%
||
|Salma Zahid
|-
|rowspan=4 style="background-color:whitesmoke" |Scarborough—Guildwood
|rowspan=4 |
|rowspan=4 |John McKay22,94461.10%
|rowspan=4 |
|rowspan=4 |Carmen Wilson7,99821.30%
|rowspan=4 |
|rowspan=4 |Michelle Spencer5,09113.56%
|rowspan=4 |
|rowspan=4 |James Bountrogiannis1,0962.92%
|
|Kevin Clarke (Ind.)155 0.41%
|rowspan=4 |
|rowspan=4 |John McKay
|-
|
|Opa Day (Ind.)85 0.23%
|-
|
|Aslam Khan (Cent.)129 0.34%
|-
|
|Gus Stefanis (CNP)52 0.14%
|-
| style="background-color:whitesmoke" |Scarborough North
||
|Shaun Chen21,17866.57%
|
|Fazal Shah5,99918.86%
|
|Christina Love3,51411.05%
|
|David Moore7632.40%
|
|Sheraz Khan (Cent.)3611.13%
||
|Shaun Chen
|-
| style="background-color:whitesmoke" |Scarborough—Rouge Park
||
|Gary Anandasangaree28,70262.78%
|
|Zia Choudhary9,62821.06%
|
|Kingsley Kwok6,06813.27%
|
|Asad Rehman1,3222.89%
|
|
||
|Gary Anandasangaree
|-
|rowspan=2 style="background-color:whitesmoke" |Scarborough Southwest
|rowspan=2 |
|rowspan=2 |Bill Blair24,82357.50%
|rowspan=2 |
|rowspan=2 |Mohsin Bhuiyan8,98120.80%
|rowspan=2 |
|rowspan=2 |Guled Arale6,92416.04%
|rowspan=2 |
|rowspan=2 |Ramona Pache1,2592.92%
|
|Amanda Cain (Green)1,068 2.47%
|rowspan=2 |
|rowspan=2 |Bill Blair
|-
|
|David Edward-Ooi Poon (Ind.)117 0.27%
|-
| style="background-color:whitesmoke" |Willowdale
||
|Ali Ehsassi21,04351.19%
|
|Daniel Lee13,91633.86%
|
|Hal Berman4,23110.29%
|
|Al Wahab1,1022.68%
|
|Anna Gorka (Green)8121.98%
||
|Ali Ehsassi
|-
| style="background-color:whitesmoke" |York Centre
||
|Ya'ara Saks17,43047.29%
|
|Joel Yakov Etienne13,94937.85%
|
|Kemal Ahmed3,75310.18%
|
|Nixon Nguyen1,7264.68%
|
|
||
|Ya'ara Saks
|}

Central Toronto

|-
|rowspan=3 style="background-color:whitesmoke" |Beaches—East York
|rowspan=3 |
|rowspan=3 |Nathaniel Erskine-Smith28,91956.58%
|rowspan=3 |
|rowspan=3 |Lisa Robinson7,33614.35%
|rowspan=3 |
|rowspan=3 |Alejandra Ruiz Vargas11,51322.52%
|rowspan=3 |
|rowspan=3 |Reuben Anthony DeBoer1,3882.72%
|rowspan=3 |
|rowspan=3 |Radu Rautescu1,6133.16%
|
|Philip Fernandez (M-L)50 0.10%
|rowspan=3 |
|rowspan=3 |Nathaniel Erskine-Smith
|-
|
|Jennifer Moxon (Comm.)131 0.26%
|-
|
|Karen Lee Wilde (Ind.)166 0.32%
|-
|rowspan=2 style="background-color:whitesmoke" |Davenport(judicial recount terminated)
|rowspan=2 |
|rowspan=2 |Julie Dzerowicz19,93042.13%
|rowspan=2 |
|rowspan=2 |Jenny Kalimbet4,77410.09%
|rowspan=2 |
|rowspan=2 |Alejandra Bravo19,85441.97%
|rowspan=2 |
|rowspan=2 |Adrian Currie1,0872.30%
|rowspan=2 |
|rowspan=2 |Tara Dos Remedios1,4993.17%
|
|Chai Kalevar (Ind.)77 0.16%
|rowspan=2 |
|rowspan=2 |Julie Dzerowicz
|-
|
|Troy Young (Ind.)86 0.18%
|-
| style="background-color:whitesmoke" |Don Valley West
||
|Rob Oliphant24,79852.75%
|
|Yvonne Robertson16,69535.51%
|
|Syeda Riaz3,8148.11%
|
|Elvira Caputolan7611.62%
|
|Michael Minas8811.87%
|
|Adil Khan (Cent.)650.14%
||
|Rob Oliphant
|-
| style="background-color:whitesmoke" |Eglinton—Lawrence
||
|Marco Mendicino24,05148.48%
|
|Geoff Pollock18,08236.45%
|
|Caleb Senneker4,5439.16%
|
|Eric Frydman1,4903.00%
|
|Timothy Gleeson1,4452.91%
|
|
||
|Marco Mendicino
|-
|rowspan=2 style="background-color:whitesmoke" |Parkdale—High Park
|rowspan=2 |
|rowspan=2 |Arif Virani22,30742.45%
|rowspan=2 |
|rowspan=2 |Nestor Sanajko6,81512.97%
|rowspan=2 |
|rowspan=2 |Paul Taylor20,60239.21%
|rowspan=2 |
|rowspan=2 |Diem Marchand-Lafortune9571.82%
|rowspan=2 |
|rowspan=2 |Wilfried Richard Alexander Danzinger1,6423.13%
|
|Lorne Gershuny (M-L)90 0.17%
|rowspan=2 |
|rowspan=2 |Arif Virani
|-
|
|Terry Parker (Mar.)130 0.25%
|-
| style="background-color:whitesmoke" |Spadina—Fort York
||
|Kevin Vuong18,99138.90%
|
|Sukhi Jandu9,87520.23%
|
|Norm Di Pasquale16,83434.48%
|
|Amanda Rosenstock1,6453.37%
|
|Ian Roden1,4763.02%
|
|
||
|Adam Vaughan$
|-
|rowspan=2 style="background-color:whitesmoke" |Toronto Centre
|rowspan=2 |
|rowspan=2 |Marci Ien23,07150.35%
|rowspan=2 |
|rowspan=2 |Ryan Lester5,57112.16%
|rowspan=2 |
|rowspan=2 |Brian Chang11,90925.99%
|rowspan=2 |
|rowspan=2 |Annamie Paul3,9218.56%
|rowspan=2 |
|rowspan=2 |Syed Jaffery1,0472.29%
|
|Ivan Byard (Comm.)181 0.40%
|rowspan=2 |
|rowspan=2 |Marci Ien
|-
|
|Peter Stubbins (Animal)117 0.26%
|-
|rowspan=3 style="background-color:whitesmoke" |Toronto—Danforth
|rowspan=3 |
|rowspan=3 |Julie Dabrusin25,21448.36%
|rowspan=3 |
|rowspan=3 |Michael Carey6,54712.56%
|rowspan=3 |
|rowspan=3 |Clare Hacksel17,55533.67%
|rowspan=3 |
|rowspan=3 |Maryem Tollar1,0231.96%
|rowspan=3 |
|rowspan=3 |Wayne Simmons1,2822.46%
|
|Habiba Desai (Ind.)123 0.24%
|rowspan=3 |
|rowspan=3 |Julie Dabrusin
|-
|
|Elizabeth Rowley (Comm.)215 0.41%
|-
|
|Liz White (Animal)183 0.35%
|-
| style="background-color:whitesmoke" |Toronto—St. Paul's
||
|Carolyn Bennett26,42949.22%
|
|Stephanie Osadchuk13,58725.30%
|
|Sidney Coles9,03616.83%
|
|Phil De Luna3,2145.99%
|
|Peter Remedios1,4322.67%
|
|
||
|Carolyn Bennett
|-
| style="background-color:whitesmoke" |University—Rosedale
||
|Chrystia Freeland22,45147.53%
|
|Steven Taylor9,47320.06%
|
|Nicole Robicheau11,92125.24%
|
|Tim Grant1,9744.18%
|
|David Kent1,1722.48%
|
|Drew Garvie (Comm.)2440.52%
||
|Chrystia Freeland
|-
| style="background-color:whitesmoke" |York South—Weston
||
|Ahmed Hussen21,64456.12%
|
|Sajanth Mohan7,78320.18%
|
|Hawa Mire6,51716.90%
|
|Nicki Ward8722.26%
|
|Sitara Chiu1,7544.55%
|
|
||
|Ahmed Hussen
|}

Brampton, Mississauga and Oakville

|-
| style="background-color:whitesmoke" |Brampton Centre
||
|Shafqat Ali16,18947.66%
|
|Jagdeep Singh11,02632.46%
|
|Jim McDowell5,93217.46%
|
|
|
|
|
|Ronni Shino (Ind.)8242.43%
||
|Ramesh Sangha†
|-
| style="background-color:whitesmoke" |Brampton East
||
|Maninder Sidhu22,12053.49%
|
|Naval Bajaj11,64728.17%
|
|Gail Bannister-Clarke6,51115.75%
|
|
|
|Manjeet Singh1,0732.59%
|
|
||
|Maninder Sidhu
|-
| style="background-color:whitesmoke" |Brampton North
||
|Ruby Sahota23,41254.26%
|
|Medha Joshi13,28930.80%
|
|Teresa Yeh6,44814.94%
|
|
|
|
|
|
||
|Ruby Sahota
|-
| style="background-color:whitesmoke" |Brampton South
||
|Sonia Sidhu21,12050.98%
|
|Ramandeep Brar12,59630.40%
|
|Tejinder Singh5,89414.23%
|
|
|
|Nicholas Craniotis1,8204.39%
|
|
||
|Sonia Sidhu
|-
| style="background-color:whitesmoke" |Brampton West
||
|Kamal Khera25,78055.31%
|
|Jermaine Chambers13,18628.29%
|
|Gurprit Gill6,09713.08%
|
|
|
|Rahul Samuel Zia1,2182.61%
|
|Sivakumar Ramasamy (Ind.)3280.70%
||
|Kamal Khera
|-
| style="background-color:whitesmoke" |Mississauga Centre
||
|Omar Alghabra25,71954.22%
|
|Kathy-Ying Zhao13,39028.23%
|
|Teneshia Samuel5,33111.24%
|
|Craig Laferriere8631.82%
|
|Elie Diab2,1284.49%
|
|
||
|Omar Alghabra
|-
|rowspan=2 style="background-color:whitesmoke" |Mississauga East—Cooksville
|rowspan=2 |
|rowspan=2 |Peter Fonseca22,80650.04%
|rowspan=2 |
|rowspan=2 |Grace Adamu14,72232.30%
|rowspan=2 |
|rowspan=2 |Tom Takacs4,67810.26%
|rowspan=2 |
|rowspan=2 |
|rowspan=2 |
|rowspan=2 |Joseph Westover2,9336.44%
|
|Gord Elliott (Ind.)329 0.72%
|rowspan=2 |
|rowspan=2 |Peter Fonseca
|-
|
|Dagmar Sullivan (M-L)107 0.23%
|-
| style="background-color:whitesmoke" |Mississauga—Erin Mills
||
|Iqra Khalid25,86651.05%
|
|James Nguyen17,08833.72%
|
|Kaukab Usman5,17810.22%
|
|Ewan DeSilva8291.64%
|
|Michael Bayer1,7113.38%
|
|
||
|Iqra Khalid
|-
| style="background-color:whitesmoke" |Mississauga—Lakeshore
||
|Sven Spengemann25,28444.94%
|
|Michael Ras21,76138.68%
|
|Sarah Walji5,4889.75%
|
|Elizabeth Robertson1,2652.25%
|
|Vahid Seyfaie2,3674.21%
|
|Kayleigh Tahk (Rhino.)940.17%
||
|Sven Spengemann
|-
| style="background-color:whitesmoke" |Mississauga—Malton
||
|Iqwinder Gaheer21,76652.77%
|
|Clyde Roach12,62530.61%
|
|Waseem Ahmed5,77113.99%
|
|Mark Davidson8111.97%
|
|
|
|Frank Chilelli (M-L)2750.67%
||
|Navdeep Bains†
|-
| style="background-color:whitesmoke" |Mississauga—Streetsville
||
|Rechie Valdez23,69847.28%
|
|Jasveen Rattan17,13134.18%
|
|Farina Hassan6,18612.34%
|
|Chris Hill1,0482.09%
|
|Gurdeep Wolosz1,8513.69%
|
|Natalie Spizzirri (Animal)2100.42%
||
|Gagan Sikand†
|-
| style="background-color:whitesmoke" |Oakville
||
|Anita Anand28,13746.13%
|
|Kerry Colborne24,43040.05%
|
|Jerome Adamo5,3738.81%
|
|Oriana Knox1,0901.79%
|
|JD Meaney1,9703.23%
|
|
||
|Anita Anand
|-
| style="background-color:whitesmoke" |Oakville North—Burlington
||
|Pam Damoff30,91046.82%
|
|Hanan Rizkalla25,09138.00%
|
|Lenaee Dupuis6,5749.96%
|
|Bruno Sousa1,0191.54%
|
|Gilbert Jubinville2,4293.68%
|
|
||
|Pam Damoff
|}

Hamilton, Burlington and Niagara

|-
| style="background-color:whitesmoke" |Burlington
||
|Karina Gould31,60245.73%
|
|Emily Brown25,74237.25%
|
|Nick Page7,50710.86%
|
|Christian Cullis1,3681.98%
|
|Michael Bator2,7644.00%
|
|Jevin David Carroll (Rhino.)1220.18%
||
|Karina Gould
|-
| style="background-color:whitesmoke" |Flamborough—Glanbrook
|
|Vito Sgro21,35035.54%
||
|Dan Muys24,37040.57%
|
|Lorne Newick9,40915.66%
|
|Thomas Hatch1,2542.09%
|
|Bill Panchyshyn3,6866.14%
|
|
||
|David Sweet†
|-
|rowspan=2 style="background-color:whitesmoke" |Hamilton Centre
|rowspan=2 |
|rowspan=2 |Margaret Bennett10,94126.50%
|rowspan=2 |
|rowspan=2 |Fabian Grenning6,20915.04%
|rowspan=2 |
|rowspan=2 |Matthew Green20,10548.70%
|rowspan=2 |
|rowspan=2 |Avra Caroline Weinstein1,1052.68%
|rowspan=2 |
|rowspan=2 |Kevin Barber2,6376.39%
|
|Nigel Cheriyan (Comm.)184 0.45%
|rowspan=2 |
|rowspan=2 |Matthew Green
|-
|
|Nathalie Xian Yi Yan (Ind.)99 0.24%
|-
| style="background-color:whitesmoke" |Hamilton East—Stoney Creek
||
|Chad Collins18,35836.87%
|
|Ned Kuruc13,93427.98%
|
|Nick Milanovic12,74825.60%
|
|Larry Pattison1,0202.05%
|
|Mario Ricci3,7337.50%
|
|
||
|Bob Bratina$
|-
| style="background-color:whitesmoke" |Hamilton Mountain
||
|Lisa Hepfner16,54834.15%
|
|Al Miles11,82824.41%
|
|Malcolm Allen15,70632.41%
|
|Dave Urquhart9742.01%
|
|Chelsey Taylor3,0986.39%
|
|Jim Enos (CHP)3060.63%
||
|Scott Duvall†
|-
| style="background-color:whitesmoke" |Hamilton West—Ancaster—Dundas
||
|Filomena Tassi27,84544.32%
|
|Bert Laranjo18,16228.91%
|
|Roberto Henriquez12,43219.79%
|
|Victoria Galea1,6612.64%
|
|Dean Woods2,5844.11%
|
|Spencer Rocchi (Rhino.)1370.22%
||
|Filomena Tassi
|-
| style="background-color:whitesmoke" |Milton
||
|Adam van Koeverden28,50351.46%
|
|Nadeem Akbar18,31333.06%
|
|Muhammad Riaz Sahi4,9258.89%
|
|Chris Kowalchuk1,2802.31%
|
|Shibli Haddad2,3654.27%
|
|
||
|Adam van Koeverden
|-
| style="background-color:whitesmoke" |Niagara Centre
||
|Vance Badawey20,57635.01%
|
|Graham Speck18,32431.17%
|
|Melissa McGlashan14,08623.96%
|
|Kurtis McCartney1,1231.91%
|
|Michael Kimmons4,6707.95%
|
|
||
|Vance Badawey
|-
| style="background-color:whitesmoke" |Niagara Falls
|
|Andrea Kaiser23,65033.48%
||
|Tony Baldinelli26,81037.95%
|
|Brian Barker12,87118.22%
|
|Melanie Holm1,3701.94%
|
|Peter Taras5,9488.42%
|
|
||
|Tony Baldinelli
|-
| style="background-color:whitesmoke" |Niagara West
|
|Ian Bingham16,81530.42%
||
|Dean Allison25,20645.60%
|
|Nameer Rahman7,06412.78%
|
|Joanna Kocsis1,6022.90%
|
|Shaunalee Derkson3,9337.12%
|
|Harold Jonker (CHP)6571.19%
||
|Dean Allison
|-
| style="background-color:whitesmoke" |St. Catharines
||
|Chris Bittle22,06937.83%
|
|Krystina Waler19,01832.60%
|
|Trecia McLennon12,29421.08%
|
|Catharine Rhodes1,0911.87%
|
|Rebecca Hahn3,8606.62%
|
|
||
|Chris Bittle
|}

Midwestern Ontario

|-
|rowspan=2 style="background-color:whitesmoke" |Brantford—Brant
|rowspan=2 |
|rowspan=2 |Alison Macdonald18,79528.42%
|rowspan=2 |
|rowspan=2 |Larry Brock26,67540.34%
|rowspan=2 |
|rowspan=2 |Adrienne Roberts12,96419.61%
|rowspan=2 |
|rowspan=2 |Karleigh Csordas1,7592.66%
|rowspan=2 |
|rowspan=2 |Cole Squire5,6338.52%
|
|Leslie Bory (Ind.)160 0.24%
|rowspan=2 |
|rowspan=2 |Phil McColeman†
|-
|
|John The Engineer Turmel (Ind.)136 0.21%
|-
| style="background-color:whitesmoke" |Cambridge
||
|Bryan May20,86638.04%
|
|Connie Cody18,87634.41%
|
|Lorne Bruce9,31916.99%
|
|Michele Braniff1,8603.39%
|
|Maggie Segounis3,9317.17%
|
|
||
|Bryan May
|-
|rowspan=2 style="background-color:whitesmoke" |Guelph
|rowspan=2 |
|rowspan=2 |Lloyd Longfield29,38242.11%
|rowspan=2 |
|rowspan=2 |Ashish Sachan16,79524.07%
|rowspan=2 |
|rowspan=2 |Aisha Jahangir14,71321.09%
|rowspan=2 |
|rowspan=2 |Michelle Bowman5,2507.52%
|rowspan=2 |
|rowspan=2 |Joshua Leier3,1824.56%
|
|Tristan Dineen (Comm.)187 0.27%
|rowspan=2 |
|rowspan=2 |Lloyd Longfield
|-
|
|Karen Levenson (Animal)262 0.38%
|-
|rowspan=2 style="background-color:whitesmoke" |Haldimand—Norfolk
|rowspan=2 |
|rowspan=2 |Karen Matthews17,22427.52%
|rowspan=2 |
|rowspan=2 |Leslyn Lewis29,66447.39%
|rowspan=2 |
|rowspan=2 |Meghan Piironen8,32013.29%
|rowspan=2 |
|rowspan=2 |
|rowspan=2 |
|rowspan=2 |Ken Gilpin6,57010.50%
|
|Charles Lugosi (CHP)559 0.89%
|rowspan=2 |
|rowspan=2 |Vacant
|-
|
|George McMorrow (VCP)255 0.41%
|-
| style="background-color:whitesmoke" |Huron—Bruce
|
|James Rice16,01526.17%
||
|Ben Lobb31,17050.93%
|
|Jan Johnstone9,05614.80%
|
|
|
|Jack Stecho4,4377.25%
|
|Justin L Smith (Ind.)5190.85%
||
|Ben Lobb
|-
| style="background-color:whitesmoke" |Kitchener Centre
|
|Raj Saini8,29716.21%
|
|Mary Henein Thorn12,53724.50%
|
|Beisan Zubi8,93817.46%
||
|Mike Morrice17,87234.92%
|
|Diane Boskovic3,3816.61%
|
|Ellen Papenburg (Animal)1540.30%
||
|Raj Saini
|-
| style="background-color:whitesmoke" |Kitchener—Conestoga
||
|Tim Louis20,02539.30%
|
|Carlene Hawley19,44838.17%
|
|Narine Dat Sookram5,94811.67%
|
|Owen Bradley1,8423.62%
|
|Kevin Dupuis3,6907.24%
|
|
||
|Tim Louis
|-
|rowspan=3 style="background-color:whitesmoke" |Kitchener South—Hespeler
|rowspan=3 |
|rowspan=3 |Valerie Bradford18,59637.45%
|rowspan=3 |
|rowspan=3 |Tyler Calver17,64935.54%
|rowspan=3 |
|rowspan=3 |Suresh Arangath8,07916.27%
|rowspan=3 |
|rowspan=3 |Gabe Rose1,7103.44%
|rowspan=3 |
|rowspan=3 |Melissa Baumgaertner3,3516.75%
|
|Elaine Baetz (M-L)57 0.11%
|rowspan=3 |
|rowspan=3 |Marwan Tabbara†
|-
|
|Stephen Davis (Rhino.)93 0.19%
|-
|
|C.A. Morrison (Ind.)119 0.24%
|-
| style="background-color:whitesmoke" |Oxford
|
|Elizabeth Quinto12,72020.53%
||
|Dave MacKenzie29,14647.05%
|
|Matthew Chambers11,32518.28%
|
|Bob Reid1,6832.72%
|
|Wendy Martin6,59510.65%
|
|Allen Scovil (CHP)4790.77%
||
|Dave MacKenzie
|-
| style="background-color:whitesmoke" |Perth—Wellington
|
|Brendan Knight13,68424.62%
||
|John Nater26,98448.55%
|
|Kevin Kruchkywich9,55217.19%
|
|
|
|Wayne Baker5,3579.64%
|
|
||
|John Nater
|-
| style="background-color:whitesmoke" |Waterloo
||
|Bardish Chagger26,92645.14%
|
|Meghan Shannon16,52827.71%
|
|Jonathan Cassels11,36019.04%
|
|Karla Villagomez Fajardo2,0383.42%
|
|Patrick Doucette2,8024.70%
|
|
||
|Bardish Chagger
|-
| style="background-color:whitesmoke" |Wellington—Halton Hills
|
|Melanie Lang18,38427.17%
||
|Michael Chong35,25752.11%
|
|Noor Jahangir7,05010.42%
|
|Ran Zhu2,6063.85%
|
|Syl Carle4,3596.44%
|
|
||
|Michael Chong
|}

Southwestern Ontario

|-
| style="background-color:whitesmoke" |Chatham-Kent—Leamington
|
|Greg Hetherington15,68328.59%
||
|Dave Epp22,43540.90%
|
|Dan Gelinas8,00714.60%
|
|Mark Vercouteren8371.53%
|
|Liz Vallee7,89214.39%
|
|
||
|Dave Epp
|-
| style="background-color:whitesmoke" |Elgin—Middlesex—London
|
|Afeez Ajibowu12,32619.55%
||
|Karen Vecchio31,47249.91%
|
|Katelyn Cody10,08615.99%
|
|Amanda Stark1,4172.25%
|
|Chelsea Hillier7,42911.78%
|
|Michael Hopkins (CHP)3280.52%
||
|Karen Vecchio
|-
|rowspan=2 style="background-color:whitesmoke" |Essex
|rowspan=2 |
|rowspan=2 |Audrey Festeryga10,81315.45%
|rowspan=2 |
|rowspan=2 |Chris Lewis28,74141.07%
|rowspan=2 |
|rowspan=2 |Tracey Ramsey22,27831.84%
|rowspan=2 |
|rowspan=2 |Nancy Pancheshan8651.24%
|rowspan=2 |
|rowspan=2 |Beth Charron-Rowberry6,9259.90%
|
|Andrew George (Ind.)172 0.25%
|rowspan=2 |
|rowspan=2 |Chris Lewis
|-
|
|Jeremy Palko (CHP)182 0.26%
|-
| style="background-color:whitesmoke" |Lambton—Kent—Middlesex
|
|Sudit Ranade12,55220.68%
||
|Lianne Rood29,43148.49%
|
|Jason Henry11,10718.30%
|
|Jeremy Hull1,0351.71%
|
|Kevin Mitchell6,56710.82%
|
|
||
|Lianne Rood
|-
| style="background-color:whitesmoke" |London—Fanshawe
|
|Mohamed Hammoud11,88223.11%
|
|Mattias Vanderley12,48624.28%
||
|Lindsay Mathyssen22,33643.44%
|
|
|
|Kyle Free4,7189.18%
|
|
||
|Lindsay Mathyssen
|-
| style="background-color:whitesmoke" |London North Centre
||
|Peter Fragiskatos22,92139.10%
|
|Stephen Gallant15,88927.11%
|
|Dirka Prout15,61126.63%
|
|Mary Ann Hodge1,2972.21%
|
|Marc Emery2,9024.95%
|
|
||
|Peter Fragiskatos
|-
| style="background-color:whitesmoke" |London West
||
|Arielle Kayabaga25,30836.88%
|
|Rob Flack22,27332.46%
|
|Shawna Lewkowitz16,85824.57%
|
|
|
|Mike McMullen3,4094.97%
|
|Jacques Y Boudreau (Libert.)7731.13%
||
|Kate Young$
|-
| style="background-color:whitesmoke" |Sarnia—Lambton
|
|Lois Nantais10,97519.29%
||
|Marilyn Gladu26,29246.21%
|
|Adam Kilner11,99021.07%
|
|Stefanie Bunko8481.49%
|
|Brian Everaert6,35911.18%
|
|Tom Laird (CHP)4350.76%
||
|Marilyn Gladu
|-
| style="background-color:whitesmoke" |Windsor—Tecumseh
||
|Irek Kusmierczyk18,13431.83%
|
|Kathy Borrelli14,60525.63%
|
|Cheryl Hardcastle17,46530.65%
|
|Henry Oulevey6821.20%
|
|Victor Green5,92710.40%
|
|Laura Chesnik (M-L)1640.29%
||
|Irek Kusmierczyk
|-
| style="background-color:whitesmoke" |Windsor West
|
|Sandra Pupatello13,52427.77%
|
|Anthony Orlando9,41519.34%
||
|Brian Masse21,54144.24%
|
|
|
|Matthew Giancola4,0608.34%
|
|Margaret Villamizar (M-L)1530.31%
||
|Brian Masse
|}

Northern Ontario

Manitoba

Rural Manitoba

|-
| style="background-color:whitesmoke" |Brandon—Souris
|
|Linda Branconnier4,60812.08%
||
|Larry Maguire22,73359.57%
|
|Whitney Hodgins7,83820.54%
|
|
|
|Tylor Baer2,9817.81%
|
|
||
|Larry Maguire
|-
| style="background-color:whitesmoke" |Churchill—Keewatinook Aski
|
|Shirley Robinson4,51425.18%
|
|Charlotte Larocque4,33024.15%
||
|Niki Ashton7,63242.57%
|
|Ralph McLean5523.08%
|
|Dylan Young8995.01%
|
|
||
|Niki Ashton
|-
| style="background-color:whitesmoke" |Dauphin—Swan River—Neepawa
|
|Kevin Carlson4,89212.70%
||
|Dan Mazier22,71858.99%
|
|Arthur Holroyd5,67814.74%
|
|Shirley Lambrecht8352.17%
|
|Donnan McKenna4,05210.52%
|
|Lori Falloon-Austin (Mav.)3390.88%
||
|Dan Mazier
|-
| style="background-color:whitesmoke" |Portage—Lisgar
|
|Andrew Carrier4,96710.95%
||
|Candice Bergen23,81952.52%
|
|Ken Friesen6,06813.38%
|
|
|
|Solomon Wiebe9,79021.58%
|
|Jerome Dondo (CHP)7121.57%
||
|Candice Bergen
|-
| style="background-color:whitesmoke" |Provencher
|
|Trevor Kirczenow8,47116.98%
||
|Ted Falk24,29448.68%
|
|Serina Pottinger6,27012.56%
|
|Janine G. Gibson1,2732.55%
|
|Nöel Gautron8,22716.49%
|
|Rick Loewen (Ind.)1,3662.74%
||
|Ted Falk
|-
| style="background-color:whitesmoke" |Selkirk—Interlake—Eastman
|
|Detlev Regelsky6,56713.24%
||
|James Bezan28,30857.06%
|
|Margaret Smith9,60419.36%
|
|Wayne James1,3282.68%
|
|Ian Kathwaroon3,8007.66%
|
|
||
|James Bezan
|}

Winnipeg

|-
| style="background-color:whitesmoke" |Charleswood—St. James—Assiniboia—Headingley
|
|Doug Eyolfson17,65138.98%
||
|Marty Morantz18,11140.00%
|
|Madelaine Dwyer6,97415.40%
|
|Vanessa Parks9472.09%
|
|Angela Van Hussen1,5943.52%
|
|
||
|Marty Morantz
|-
| style="background-color:whitesmoke" |Elmwood—Transcona
|
|Sara Mirwaldt6,16914.74%
|
|Rejeanne Caron11,76828.13%
||
|Daniel Blaikie20,79149.69%
|
|Devlin Hinchey6761.62%
|
|Jamie Cumming2,4355.82%
|
|
||
|Daniel Blaikie
|-
| style="background-color:whitesmoke" |Kildonan—St. Paul
|
|Mary-Jane Bennett12,93429.43%
||
|Raquel Dancho18,37541.81%
|
|Emily Clark10,31323.47%
|
|
|
|Sean Howe2,3255.29%
|
|
||
|Raquel Dancho
|-
|rowspan=3 style="background-color:whitesmoke" |Saint Boniface—Saint Vital
|rowspan=3 |
|rowspan=3 |Dan Vandal19,90843.78%
|rowspan=3 |
|rowspan=3 |Shola Agboola12,74928.04%
|rowspan=3 |
|rowspan=3 |Meghan Waters9,76721.48%
|rowspan=3 |
|rowspan=3 |Laurent Poliquin6761.49%
|rowspan=3 |
|rowspan=3 |Jane MacDiarmid1,9784.35%
|
| (Rhino.)80 0.18%
|rowspan=3 |
|rowspan=3 |Dan Vandal
|-
|
|Matthew Correia (VCP)17 0.04%
|-
|colspan=2 |14 independents below table
|-
|rowspan=2 style="background-color:whitesmoke" |Winnipeg Centre
|rowspan=2 |
|rowspan=2 |Paul Ong8,44628.39%
|rowspan=2 |
|rowspan=2 |Sabrina Brenot3,81812.83%
|rowspan=2 |
|rowspan=2 |Leah Gazan14,96250.29%
|rowspan=2 |
|rowspan=2 |Andrew Brown7082.38%
|rowspan=2 |
|rowspan=2 |Bhavni Bhakoo1,2294.13%
|
|Jamie Buhler (Libert.)373 1.25%
|rowspan=2 |
|rowspan=2 |Leah Gazan
|-
|
|Debra Wall (Animal)213 0.72%
|-
| style="background-color:whitesmoke" |Winnipeg North
||
|Kevin Lamoureux16,44252.35%
|
|Anas Kassem4,12613.14%
|
|Melissa Chung-Mowat8,99828.65%
|
|Angela Brydges4181.33%
|
|Patrick Neilan1,3154.19%
|
|Robert Crooks (Comm.)1090.35%
||
|Kevin Lamoureux
|-
| style="background-color:whitesmoke" |Winnipeg South
||
|Terry Duguid22,42347.46%
|
|Melanie Maher15,96733.80%
|
|Aiden Kahanovitch6,63214.04%
|
|Greg Boettcher6811.44%
|
|Byron Curtis Gryba1,5423.26%
|
|
||
|Terry Duguid
|-
| style="background-color:whitesmoke" |Winnipeg South Centre
||
|Jim Carr22,21445.55%
|
|Joyce Bateman13,56627.82%
|
|Julia Riddell10,06420.64%
|
|Douglas Hemmerling1,3412.75%
|
|Chase Wells1,3522.77%
|
|Cam Scott (Comm.)2340.48%
||
|Jim Carr
|}
Independents of Saint Boniface—Saint Vital (number of votes, percentage)

Scott A A Anderson (58, 0.13%)
Denis Berthiaume (16, 0.04%)
Jean-Denis Boudreault (24, 0.05%)
Naomi Crisostomo (31, 0.07%)

Charles Currie (25, 0.05%)
Manon Lili Desbiens (11, 0.02%)
Alexandra Engering (14, 0.03%)
Scott Falkingham (14, 0.03%)

Kerri Hildebrandt (31, 0.07%)
Ryan Huard (14, 0.03%)
Conrad Lukawski (7, 0.02%)
Eliana Rosenblum (13, 0.03%)

Patrick Strzalkowski (21, 0.05%)
Tomas Szuchewycz (15, 0.03%)

Saskatchewan

Southern Saskatchewan

|-
| style="background-color:whitesmoke" |Cypress Hills—Grasslands
|
|Mackenzie Hird1,4924.35%
||
|Jeremy Patzer24,51871.53%
|
|Alex McPhee3,60410.51%
|
|Carol Vandale2840.83%
|
|Charles Reginald Hislop2,8268.24%
|
|Mark Skagen1,3603.97%
|
|Maria Rose Lewans1930.56%
||
|Jeremy Patzer
|-
| style="background-color:whitesmoke" |Moose Jaw—Lake Centre—Lanigan
|
|Katelyn Zimmer2,5266.13%
||
|Fraser Tolmie24,86960.39%
|
|Talon Regent7,97519.36%
|
|Isaiah Hunter4381.06%
|
|Chey Craik4,71211.44%
|
|David Craig Townsend6641.61%
|
|
||
|Tom Lukiwski†
|-
| style="background-color:whitesmoke" |Regina—Lewvan
|
|Susan Cameron6,31013.82%
||
|Warren Steinley21,37546.83%
|
|Tria Donaldson15,76334.54%
|
|Michael Wright5601.23%
|
|Roderick Kletchko1,6353.58%
|
|
|
|
||
|Warren Steinley
|-
| style="background-color:whitesmoke" |Regina—Qu'Appelle
|
|Cecilia Melanson3,34410.15%
||
|Andrew Scheer20,40061.90%
|
|Annaliese Bos6,87920.87%
|
|Naomi Hunter6682.03%
|
|Andrew Yubeta1,6685.06%
|
|
|
|
||
|Andrew Scheer
|-
| style="background-color:whitesmoke" |Regina—Wascana
|
|Sean McEachern10,39026.92%
||
|Michael Kram19,26149.90%
|
|Erin Hidlebaugh6,97518.07%
|
|Victor Lau6221.61%
|
|Mario Milanovski1,3523.50%
|
|
|
|
||
|Michael Kram
|-
| style="background-color:whitesmoke" |Souris—Moose Mountain
|
|Javin Ames-Sinclair1,6364.16%
||
|Robert Kitchen30,04976.38%
|
|Hannah Ann Duerr3,1077.90%
|
|
|
|Diane Neufeld3,5719.08%
|
|Greg Douglas9772.48%
|
|
||
|Robert Kitchen
|-
| style="background-color:whitesmoke" |Yorkton—Melville
|
|Jordan Ames-Sinclair2,1876.31%
||
|Cathay Wagantall23,79468.65%
|
|Halsten David Rust4,23912.23%
|
|Valerie Brooks6141.77%
|
|Braden Robertson3,2279.31%
|
|Denise Loucks5971.72%
|
|
||
|Cathay Wagantall
|}

Northern Saskatchewan

|-
| style="background-color:whitesmoke" |Battlefords—Lloydminster
|
|Larry Ingram1,7485.63%
||
|Rosemarie Falk21,33668.72%
|
|Erik Hansen3,71811.98%
|
|Kerri Wall2370.76%
|
|Terry Sieben1,8475.95%
|
|Ken Rutherford (Mav.)2,1626.96%
||
|Rosemarie Falk
|-
| style="background-color:whitesmoke" |Carlton Trail—Eagle Creek
|
|Harrison Andruschak2,0665.03%
||
|Kelly Block28,19268.61%
|
|Shannon O'Toole5,60813.65%
|
|Cherese Reemaul3790.92%
|
|Micheal Bohach3,7919.23%
|
|Diane Pastoor (Mav.)1,0532.56%
||
|Kelly Block
|-
| style="background-color:whitesmoke" |Desnethé—Missinippi—Churchill River
|
|Buckley Belanger5,53326.89%
||
|Gary Vidal10,03648.78%
|
|Harmonie King3,54817.25%
|
|Nasser Dean Chalifoux2151.05%
|
|Dezirae Reddekopp1,0024.87%
|
|Stephen King (Ind.)2401.17%
||
|Gary Vidal
|-
| style="background-color:whitesmoke" |Prince Albert
|
|Estelle Hjertaas3,65310.61%
||
|Randy Hoback22,34064.89%
|
|Ken MacDougall5,21415.15%
|
|Hamish Graham3641.06%
|
|Joseph McCrea2,3886.94%
|
|Heather Schmitt (Mav.)4661.35%
||
|Randy Hoback
|-
| style="background-color:whitesmoke" |Saskatoon—Grasswood
|
|Rokhan Sarwar6,46014.17%
||
|Kevin Waugh22,76049.91%
|
|Kyla Kitzul13,72030.09%
|
|Gillian Walker5561.22%
|
|Mark Friesen2,1084.62%
|
|
||
|Kevin Waugh
|-
|rowspan=2 style="background-color:whitesmoke" |Saskatoon—University
|rowspan=2 |
|rowspan=2 |Dawn Dumont Walker4,60810.84%
|rowspan=2 |
|rowspan=2 |Corey Tochor20,38947.95%
|rowspan=2 |
|rowspan=2 |Claire Card15,04235.38%
|rowspan=2 |
|rowspan=2 |North-Marie Hunter4050.95%
|rowspan=2 |
|rowspan=2 |Guto Penteado1,7784.18%
|
|Jeremy Fisher (Comm.)100 0.24%
|rowspan=2 |
|rowspan=2 |Corey Tochor
|-
|
|Carl A Wesolowski (CHP)195 0.46%
|-
| style="background-color:whitesmoke" |Saskatoon West
|
|Ruben Rajakumar2,7788.19%
||
|Brad Redekopp15,37945.36%
|
|Robert Doucette13,32839.31%
|
|Dave Greenfield3571.05%
|
|Kevin Boychuk2,0646.09%
|
|
||
|Brad Redekopp
|}

Alberta

Rural Alberta

|-
|rowspan=3 style="background-color:whitesmoke" |Banff—Airdrie
|rowspan=3 |
|rowspan=3 |David Gamble9,57212.43%
|rowspan=3 |
|rowspan=3 |Blake Richards43,67756.73%
|rowspan=3 |
|rowspan=3 |Sarah Zagoda12,48216.21%
|rowspan=3 |
|rowspan=3 |Aidan Blum1,4051.82%
|rowspan=3 |
|rowspan=3 |Nadine Wellwood5,8087.54%
|rowspan=3 |
|rowspan=3 |Tariq Elnaga1,4751.92%
|
|Caroline O'Driscoll (Ind.)489 0.64%
|rowspan=3 |
|rowspan=3 |Blake Richards
|-
|
|Derek Sloan (NA)2,020 2.62%
|-
|
|Ron Voss (Ind.)60 0.08%
|-
| style="background-color:whitesmoke" |Battle River—Crowfoot
|
|Leah Diane McLeod2,5154.29%
||
|Damien Kurek41,81971.29%
|
|Tonya Ratushniak5,7619.82%
|
|Daniel Brisbin5540.94%
|
|Dennis Trepanier5,4409.27%
|
|Jeff Golka2,3934.08%
|
|John Irwin (VCP)1780.30%
||
|Damien Kurek
|-
| style="background-color:whitesmoke" |Bow River
|
|Getu Shawile3,8697.57%
||
|Martin Shields35,67669.76%
|
|Michael MacLean4,7269.24%
|
|
|
|Jonathan Bridges5,1089.99%
|
|Orrin Bliss1,3682.68%
|
|Tom Lipp (CHP)3910.76%
||
|Martin Shields
|-
| style="background-color:whitesmoke" |Foothills
|
|Paula Shimp4,4416.92%
||
|John Barlow44,45669.23%
|
|Michelle Traxel7,11711.08%
|
|Brett Rogers8021.25%
|
|Daniel Hunter5,1117.96%
|
|Josh Wylie2,2893.56%
|
|
||
|John Barlow
|-
| style="background-color:whitesmoke" |Fort McMurray—Cold Lake
|
|Abdifatah Abdi3,0607.09%
||
|Laila Goodridge29,24267.77%
|
|Garnett Robinson4,37710.14%
|
|Brian Deheer4230.98%
|
|Shawn McDonald5,48112.70%
|
|Jonathan Meyers4791.11%
|
|Hughie Shane Whitmore (VCP)880.20%
||
|David Yurdiga$
|-
| style="background-color:whitesmoke" |Grande Prairie—Mackenzie
|
|Dan Campbell2,3974.51%
||
|Chris Warkentin36,36168.42%
|
|Jennifer Villebrun6,46212.16%
|
|
|
|Shawn McLean5,41110.18%
|
|Ambrose Ralph2,1954.13%
|
|Donovan Eckstrom (Rhino.)3140.59%
||
|Chris Warkentin
|-
| style="background-color:whitesmoke" |Lakeland
|
|John Turvey2,6104.96%
||
|Shannon Stubbs36,55769.43%
|
|Des Bissonnette5,51910.48%
|
|Kira Brunner4640.88%
|
|Ann McCormack5,82711.07%
|
|Fred Sirett1,6743.18%
|
|
||
|Shannon Stubbs
|-
|rowspan=2 style="background-color:whitesmoke" |Lethbridge
|rowspan=2 |
|rowspan=2 |Devon Hargreaves8,92815.14%
|rowspan=2 |
|rowspan=2 |Rachael Harder32,81755.65%
|rowspan=2 |
|rowspan=2 |Elaine Perez11,38619.31%
|rowspan=2 |
|rowspan=2 |
|rowspan=2 |
|rowspan=2 |Kimmie Hovan4,0976.95%
|rowspan=2 |
|rowspan=2 |
|
|Geoffrey Capp (CHP)566 0.96%
|rowspan=2 |
|rowspan=2 |Rachael Harder
|-
|
|Kim Siever (Ind.)1,179 2.00%
|-
| style="background-color:whitesmoke" |Medicine Hat—Cardston—Warner
|
|Hannah Wilson3,5157.26%
||
|Glen Motz31,64865.37%
|
|Jocelyn Stenger6,81614.08%
|
|Diandra Bruised Head7251.50%
|
|Brodie Heidinger4,4849.26%
|
|Geoff Shoesmith1,2262.53%
|
|
||
|Glen Motz
|-
| style="background-color:whitesmoke" |Peace River—Westlock
|
|Leslie Penny2,4315.20%
||
|Arnold Viersen29,48663.02%
|
|Gail Ungstad6,01912.86%
|
|Jordan Francis MacDougall3640.78%
|
|Darryl Boisson5,91612.64%
|
|Colin Krieger2,5735.50%
|
|
||
|Arnold Viersen
|-
|rowspan=2 style="background-color:whitesmoke" |Red Deer—Lacombe
|rowspan=2 |
|rowspan=2 |David Ondieki3,7045.98%
|rowspan=2 |
|rowspan=2 |Blaine Calkins39,80564.22%
|rowspan=2 |
|rowspan=2 |Tanya Heyden-Kaye8,80614.21%
|rowspan=2 |
|rowspan=2 |
|rowspan=2 |
|rowspan=2 |Megan Lim7,89312.73%
|rowspan=2 |
|rowspan=2 |Harry Joujan9861.59%
|
|Joan Barnes (NA)573 0.92%
|rowspan=2 |
|rowspan=2 |Blaine Calkins
|-
|
|Matthew Watson (Libert.)212 0.34%
|-
|rowspan=2 style="background-color:whitesmoke" |Red Deer—Mountain View
|rowspan=2 |
|rowspan=2 |Olumide Adewumi4,0846.45%
|rowspan=2 |
|rowspan=2 |Earl Dreeshen40,68064.25%
|rowspan=2 |
|rowspan=2 |Marie Grabowski8,82613.94%
|rowspan=2 |
|rowspan=2 |
|rowspan=2 |
|rowspan=2 |Kelly Lorencz7,58111.97%
|rowspan=2 |
|rowspan=2 |Mark Wilcox1,6402.59%
|
|Jared Pilon (Libert.)211 0.33%
|rowspan=2 |
|rowspan=2 |Earl Dreeshen
|-
|
|Clayten Willington (Ind.)298 0.47%
|-
| style="background-color:whitesmoke" |Yellowhead
|
|Sheila Schumacher2,8295.57%
||
|Gerald Soroka33,60366.16%
|
|Guillaume Roy5,97711.77%
|
|
|
|Michael Manchen6,47512.75%
|
|Todd Muir1,7613.47%
|
|Gordon Francey (VCP)1470.29%
||
|Gerald Soroka
|}

Greater Edmonton

|-
|rowspan=2 style="background-color:whitesmoke" |Edmonton Centre
|rowspan=2 |
|rowspan=2 |Randy Boissonnault16,56033.69%
|rowspan=2 |
|rowspan=2 |James Cumming15,94532.44%
|rowspan=2 |
|rowspan=2 |Heather MacKenzie14,17128.83%
|rowspan=2 |
|rowspan=2 |Brock Crocker2,0944.26%
|
|Merryn Edwards (M-L)112 0.23%
|rowspan=2 |
|rowspan=2 |James Cumming
|-
|
|Valerie Keefe (Libert.)266 0.54%
|-
|rowspan=4 style="background-color:whitesmoke" |Edmonton Griesbach
|rowspan=4 |
|rowspan=4 |Habiba Mohamud5,97913.89%
|rowspan=4 |
|rowspan=4 |Kerry Diotte15,95737.06%
|rowspan=4 |
|rowspan=4 |Blake Desjarlais17,45740.54%
|rowspan=4 |
|rowspan=4 |Thomas Matty2,6176.08%
|
|Alex Boykowich (Comm.)140 0.33%
|rowspan=4 |
|rowspan=4 |Kerry Diotte
|-
|
|Mary Joyce (M-L)103 0.24%
|-
|
|Heather Lau (Green)538 1.25%
|-
|
|Morgan Watson (Libert.)268 0.62%
|-
| style="background-color:whitesmoke" |Edmonton Manning
|
|Donna Lynn Smith10,46821.27%
||
|Ziad Aboultaif20,21941.07%
|
|Charmaine St. Germain14,99930.47%
|
|Martin Halvorson3,4076.92%
|
|Andre Vachon (M-L)1330.27%
||
|Ziad Aboultaif
|-
| style="background-color:whitesmoke" |Edmonton Mill Woods
|
|Ben Henderson16,49934.01%
||
|Tim Uppal18,39237.91%
|
|Nigel Logan10,55321.75%
|
|Paul Edward McCormack2,8985.97%
|
|Naomi Rankin (Comm.)1720.35%
||
|Tim Uppal
|-
| style="background-color:whitesmoke" |Edmonton Riverbend
|
|Tariq Chaudary14,16924.89%
||
|Matt Jeneroux25,70245.15%
|
|Shawn Gray14,15424.86%
|
|Jennifer Peace2,1423.76%
|
|Melanie Hoffman (Green)7611.34%
||
|Matt Jeneroux
|-
|rowspan=2 style="background-color:whitesmoke" |Edmonton Strathcona
|rowspan=2 |
|rowspan=2 |Hibo Mohamed3,9487.56%
|rowspan=2 |
|rowspan=2 |Tunde Obasan13,31025.49%
|rowspan=2 |
|rowspan=2 |Heather McPherson31,69060.68%
|rowspan=2 |
|rowspan=2 |Wes Janke2,3664.53%
|
|Kelly Green (Green)634 1.21%
|rowspan=2 |
|rowspan=2 |Heather McPherson
|-
|
|Malcolm Stinson (Libert.)275 0.53%
|-
| style="background-color:whitesmoke" |Edmonton West
|
|Adam Wilson Brown13,01623.25%
||
|Kelly McCauley25,27845.15%
|
|Sandra Hunter14,19025.34%
|
|Brent Kinzel3,3545.99%
|
|Peggy Morton (M-L)1510.27%
||
|Kelly McCauley
|-
| style="background-color:whitesmoke" |Edmonton—Wetaskiwin
|
|Ron Thiering12,22914.08%
||
|Mike Lake48,34055.66%
|
|Hugo Charles18,25921.03%
|
|Tyler Beauchamp7,6708.83%
|
|Travis Calliou (VCP)3450.40%
||
|Mike Lake
|-
| style="background-color:whitesmoke" |St. Albert—Edmonton
|
|Greg Springate11,18817.95%
||
|Michael Cooper29,65247.56%
|
|Kathleen Mpulubusi17,81628.58%
|
|Brigitte Cecelia3,6845.91%
|
|
||
|Michael Cooper
|-
|rowspan=3 style="background-color:whitesmoke" |Sherwood Park—Fort Saskatchewan
|rowspan=3 |
|rowspan=3 |Tanya Holm8,73012.23%
|rowspan=3 |
|rowspan=3 |Garnett Genuis41,09257.55%
|rowspan=3 |
|rowspan=3 |Aidan Bradley Theroux14,74020.64%
|rowspan=3 |
|rowspan=3 |John Wetterstrand5,0047.01%
|
|Todd Newberry (Mav.)849 1.19%
|rowspan=3 |
|rowspan=3 |Garnett Genuis
|-
|
|Sheldon Jonah Perris (Green)700 0.98%
|-
|
|Charles Simpson (Ind.)283 0.40%
|-
|rowspan=2 style="background-color:whitesmoke" |Sturgeon River—Parkland
|rowspan=2 |
|rowspan=2 |Irene Walker4,5796.89%
|rowspan=2 |
|rowspan=2 |Dane Lloyd40,95761.61%
|rowspan=2 |
|rowspan=2 |Kendra Mills12,53218.85%
|rowspan=2 |
|rowspan=2 |Murray MacKinnon6,67110.04%
|
|Jeff Dunham (Mav.)1,240 1.87%
|rowspan=2 |
|rowspan=2 |Dane Lloyd
|-
|
|Jeffrey Willerton (CHP)497 0.75%
|-
|}

Calgary

|-
| style="background-color:whitesmoke" |Calgary Centre
|
|Sabrina Grover17,59329.71%
||
|Greg McLean30,37551.30%
|
|Juan Estevez Moreno9,69416.37%
|
|Austin Mullins9711.64%
|
|
|
|
|
|Dawid Pawlowski (CHP)5750.97%
||
|Greg McLean
|-
| style="background-color:whitesmoke" |Calgary Confederation
|
|Murray Sigler17,56028.49%
||
|Len Webber28,36746.03%
|
|Gulshan Akter10,56117.14%
|
|Natalie Odd2,2953.72%
|
|Edward Gao2,6704.33%
|
|
|
|Kevan Hunter (M-L)1780.29%
||
|Len Webber
|-
| style="background-color:whitesmoke" |Calgary Forest Lawn
|
|Jordan Stein9,60827.73%
||
|Jasraj Singh Hallan15,43444.55%
|
|Keira Gunn6,25418.05%
|
|Carey Rutherford6992.02%
|
|Dwayne Holub2,4687.12%
|
|
|
|Jonathan Trautman (Comm.)1850.53%
||
|Jasraj Hallan
|-
| style="background-color:whitesmoke" |Calgary Heritage
|
|Scott Forsyth8,96016.73%
||
|Bob Benzen30,87057.66%
|
|Kathleen M. Johnson9,32017.41%
|
|Malka Labell7661.43%
|
|Bailey Bedard2,6825.01%
|
|Annelise Freeman7141.33%
|
|Mark Dejewski (Rhino.)2300.43%
||
|Bob Benzen
|-
| style="background-color:whitesmoke" |Calgary Midnapore
|
|Zarnab Zafar7,94712.32%
||
|Stephanie Kusie39,14760.66%
|
|Gurmit Bhachu11,82618.33%
|
|Shaun T. Pulsifer8681.35%
|
|Jonathan Hagel3,9306.09%
|
|Matt Magolan8121.26%
|
|
||
|Stephanie Kusie
|-
|rowspan=4 style="background-color:whitesmoke" |Calgary Nose Hill
|rowspan=4 |
|rowspan=4 |Jessica Dale-Walker10,31120.46%
|rowspan=4 |
|rowspan=4 |Michelle Rempel Garner28,00155.57%
|rowspan=4 |
|rowspan=4 |Khalis Ahmed8,50016.87%
|rowspan=4 |
|rowspan=4 |Judson Hansell6361.26%
|rowspan=4 |
|rowspan=4 |Kyle Scott2,3244.61%
|rowspan=4 |
|rowspan=4 |
|
|Peggy Askin (M-L)105 0.21%
|rowspan=4 |
|rowspan=4 |Michelle Rempel Garner
|-
|
|Stephen J Garvey (NCA)62 0.12%
|-
|
|Larry R. Heather (CHP)169 0.34%
|-
|
|Vanessa Wang (Rhino.)285 0.57%
|-
| style="background-color:whitesmoke" |Calgary Rocky Ridge
|
|Shahnaz Munir14,69322.23%
||
|Pat Kelly36,03454.53%
|
|Jena Dianne Kieren10,74816.26%
|
|Catriona Wright1,0521.59%
|
|Rory MacLeod3,0034.54%
|
|David Robinson5540.84%
|
|
||
|Pat Kelly
|-
|rowspan=2 style="background-color:whitesmoke" |Calgary Shepard
|rowspan=2 |
|rowspan=2 |Cam Macdonald10,30314.01%
|rowspan=2 |
|rowspan=2 |Tom Kmiec44,41160.37%
|rowspan=2 |
|rowspan=2 |Raj Jessel12,10316.45%
|rowspan=2 |
|rowspan=2 |Evelyn Tanaka1,3001.77%
|rowspan=2 |
|rowspan=2 |Ron Vaillant4,2845.82%
|rowspan=2 |
|rowspan=2 |Andrea Lee8741.19%
|
|Jesse Halmo (NCA)56 0.08%
|rowspan=2 |
|rowspan=2 |Tom Kmiec
|-
|
|Konstantine Muirhead (Ind.)228 0.31%
|-
| style="background-color:whitesmoke" |Calgary Signal Hill
|
|Shawn Duncan11,10618.60%
||
|Ron Liepert35,21758.98%
|
|Patrick King8,86314.84%
|
|Keiran Corrigall1,0941.83%
|
|Nick Debrey2,8594.79%
|
|Ajay Copp5680.95%
|
|
||
|Ron Liepert
|-
|rowspan=3 style="background-color:whitesmoke" |Calgary Skyview
|rowspan=3 |
|rowspan=3 |George Chahal20,09242.36%
|rowspan=3 |
|rowspan=3 |Jag Sahota17,11136.07%
|rowspan=3 |
|rowspan=3 |Gurinder Singh Gill7,69016.21%
|rowspan=3 |
|rowspan=3 |Janna So4320.91%
|rowspan=3 |
|rowspan=3 |Harry Dhillon1,7203.63%
|rowspan=3 |
|rowspan=3 |
|
|Lee Aquart (Ind.)184 0.39%
|rowspan=3 |
|rowspan=3 |Jag Sahota
|-
|
|Daniel Blanchard (M-L)111 0.23%
|-
|
|Nadeem Rana (Cent.)93 0.20%
|}

British Columbia

BC Interior

|-
| style="background-color:whitesmoke" |Cariboo—Prince George
|
|Garth Frizzell8,39716.56%
||
|Todd Doherty25,77150.82%
|
|Audrey McKinnon10,32320.36%
|
|Leigh Hunsinger-Chang1,8443.64%
|
|Jeremy Gustafson4,1608.20%
|
|Henry Thiessen (CHP)2180.43%
||
|Todd Doherty
|-
| style="background-color:whitesmoke" |Central Okanagan—Similkameen—Nicola
|
|Sarah Eves13,29120.70%
||
|Dan Albas30,56347.60%
|
|Joan Phillip13,81321.51%
|
|Brennan Wauters1,7552.73%
|
|4,7887.46%
|
|
||
|Dan Albas
|-
|rowspan=2 style="background-color:whitesmoke" |Kamloops—Thompson—Cariboo
|rowspan=2 |
|rowspan=2 |Jesse McCormick12,71718.05%
|rowspan=2 |
|rowspan=2 |Frank Caputo30,28142.98%
|rowspan=2 |
|rowspan=2 |Bill Sundhu20,43129.00%
|rowspan=2 |
|rowspan=2 |Iain Currie2,5763.66%
|rowspan=2 |
|rowspan=2 |Corally Delwo4,0335.72%
|
|Wayne Allan (Ind.)146 0.21%
|rowspan=2 |
|rowspan=2 |Cathy McLeod†
|-
|
|Bob O'Brien (Ind.)264 0.37%
|-
| style="background-color:whitesmoke" |Kelowna—Lake Country
|
|Tim Krupa17,76726.46%
||
|Tracy Gray30,40945.29%
|
|Cade Desjarlais12,20418.18%
|
|Imre Szeman2,0743.09%
|
|Brian Rogers4,6886.98%
|
|
||
|Tracy Gray
|-
| style="background-color:whitesmoke" |Kootenay—Columbia
|
|Robin Goldsbury5,8799.05%
||
|Rob Morrison28,05643.19%
|
|Wayne Stetski23,98636.92%
|
|Rana Nelson2,5773.97%
|
|Sarah Bennett4,4676.88%
|
|
||
|Rob Morrison
|-
| style="background-color:whitesmoke" |North Okanagan—Shuswap
|
|Shelley Desautels13,66618.88%
||
|Mel Arnold33,62646.45%
|
|Ron Johnston13,92919.24%
|
|Andrea Gunner3,9675.48%
|
|Kyle Delfing7,2099.96%
|
|
||
|Mel Arnold
|-
|rowspan=2 style="background-color:whitesmoke" |Prince George—Peace River—Northern Rockies
|rowspan=2 |
|rowspan=2 |Amir Alavi4,2368.61%
|rowspan=2 |
|rowspan=2 |Bob Zimmer29,88260.74%
|rowspan=2 |
|rowspan=2 |Cory Grizz Longley6,64713.51%
|rowspan=2 |
|rowspan=2 |Catharine Kendall1,6613.38%
|rowspan=2 |
|rowspan=2 |Ryan Dyck5,13810.44%
|
|Phil Hewkin (CFF)53 0.11%
|rowspan=2 |
|rowspan=2 |Bob Zimmer
|-
|
|David Jeffers (Mav.)1,580 3.21%
|-
| style="background-color:whitesmoke" |Skeena—Bulkley Valley
|
|Lakhwinder Jhaj2,8667.66%
|
|13,51336.14%
||
|Taylor Bachrach15,92142.58%
|
|Adeana Young1,4063.76%
|
|Jody Craven2,8887.72%
|
|Rod Taylor (CHP)7972.13%
||
|Taylor Bachrach
|-
| style="background-color:whitesmoke" |South Okanagan—West Kootenay
|
|Ken Robertson8,15912.22%
|
|Helena Konanz23,67535.45%
||
|Richard Cannings27,59541.32%
|
|Tara Howse2,4853.72%
|
|Sean Taylor4,8667.29%
|
|
||
|Richard Cannings
|}

Fraser Valley and Southern Lower Mainland

|-
| style="background-color:whitesmoke" |Abbotsford
|
|Navreen Gill10,90724.21%
||
|Ed Fast21,59747.94%
|
|7,72917.16%
|
|Stephen Fowler1,5173.37%
|
|Kevin Sinclair3,3007.33%
|
|
||
|Ed Fast
|-
| style="background-color:whitesmoke" |Chilliwack—Hope
|
|Kelly Velonis8,85116.97%
||
|Mark Strahl23,98745.99%
|
|DJ Pohl13,92726.70%
|
|Arthur Green1,3912.67%
|
|Rob Bogunovic4,0047.68%
|
|
||
|Mark Strahl
|-
| style="background-color:whitesmoke" |Cloverdale—Langley City
||
|John Aldag20,87739.21%
|
|Tamara Jansen19,22336.10%
|
|Rajesh Jayaprakash10,58719.88%
|
|
|
|Ian Kennedy2,5634.81%
|
|
||
|Tamara Jansen
|-
| style="background-color:whitesmoke" |Delta
||
|Carla Qualtrough22,10542.26%
|
|Garry Shearer17,69533.83%
|
|Monika Dean9,59118.34%
|
|Jeremy Smith1,2442.38%
|
|Paul Tarasenko1,2912.47%
|
|Hong Yan Pan (Ind.)3790.72%
||
|Carla Qualtrough
|-
| style="background-color:whitesmoke" |Fleetwood—Port Kells
||
|Ken Hardie21,35045.25%
|
|Dave Hayer14,55330.84%
|
|Raji Toor8,96018.99%
|
|Perry DeNure8921.89%
|
|Amrit Birring1,2842.72%
|
|Murali Krishnan (Ind.)1460.31%
||
|Ken Hardie
|-
| style="background-color:whitesmoke" |Langley—Aldergrove
|
|Kim Richter16,56526.45%
||
|Tako Van Popta28,64345.73%
|
|Michael Chang12,28819.62%
|
|Kaija Farstad1,7982.87%
|
|Rayna Boychuk3,3415.33%
|
|
||
|Tako van Popta
|-
| style="background-color:whitesmoke" |Mission—Matsqui—Fraser Canyon
|
|Geet Grewal10,59824.55%
||
|Brad Vis18,90843.79%
|
|Lynn Perrin8,70920.17%
|
|Nicole Bellay1,8874.37%
|
|Tyler Niles3,0737.12%
|
|
||
|Brad Vis
|-
|rowspan=2 style="background-color:whitesmoke" |Pitt Meadows—Maple Ridge
|rowspan=2 |
|rowspan=2 |Ahmed Yousef13,17924.94%
|rowspan=2 |
|rowspan=2 |Marc Dalton19,37136.66%
|rowspan=2 |
|rowspan=2 |Phil Klapwyk16,86931.93%
|rowspan=2 |
|rowspan=2 |
|rowspan=2 |
|rowspan=2 |Juliuss Hoffmann2,8005.30%
|
|Peter Buddle (Rhino.)161 0.30%
|rowspan=2 |
|rowspan=2 |Marc Dalton
|-
|
|Steven William Ranta (Ind.)453 0.86%
|-
| style="background-color:whitesmoke" |Richmond Centre
||
|Wilson Miao13,44039.34%
|
|Alice Wong12,66837.08%
|
|Sandra Nixon6,19618.14%
|
|Laura Gillanders1,1093.25%
|
|James Hinton7482.19%
|
|
||
|Alice Wong
|-
| style="background-color:whitesmoke" |South Surrey—White Rock
|
|Gordie Hogg22,16638.95%
||
|Kerry-Lynne Findlay24,15842.45%
|
|June Liu8,39514.75%
|
|
|
|Gary Jensen2,1863.84%
|
|
||
|Kerry-Lynne Findlay
|-
| style="background-color:whitesmoke" |Steveston—Richmond East
||
|Parm Bains16,54342.47%
|
|Kenny Chiu13,06633.55%
|
|Jack Trovato7,52519.32%
|
|Françoise Raunet8602.21%
|
|Jennifer Singh9552.45%
|
|
||
|Kenny Chiu
|-
|rowspan=2 style="background-color:whitesmoke" |Surrey Centre
|rowspan=2 |
|rowspan=2 |Randeep Sarai16,86243.93%
|rowspan=2 |
|rowspan=2 |Tina Bains8,09421.09%
|rowspan=2 |
|rowspan=2 |Sonia Andhi10,62727.68%
|rowspan=2 |
|rowspan=2 |Felix Kongyuy8382.18%
|rowspan=2 |
|rowspan=2 |Joe Kennedy1,5394.01%
|
|Ryan Abbott (Comm.)137 0.36%
|rowspan=2 |
|rowspan=2 |Randeep Sarai
|-
|
|Kevin Pielak (CHP)289 0.75%
|-
| style="background-color:whitesmoke" |Surrey—Newton
||
|Sukh Dhaliwal19,72153.87%
|
|Syed Mohsin5,75815.73%
|
|Avneet Johal9,53626.05%
|
|
|
|Pamela Singh9672.64%
|
|Parveer Hundal (Ind.)6281.72%
||
|Sukh Dhaliwal
|}

Northern Lower Mainland

|-
| style="background-color:whitesmoke" |Burnaby North—Seymour
||
|Terry Beech19,44539.54%
|
|Kelsey Shein12,53525.49%
|
|Jim Hanson14,31829.11%
|
|Peter Dolling1,5163.08%
|
|Brad Nickerson1,3702.79%
|
|
||
|Terry Beech
|-
| style="background-color:whitesmoke" |Burnaby South
|
|Brea Huang Sami12,36130.44%
|
|Likky Lavji9,10422.42%
||
|Jagmeet Singh16,38240.34%
|
|Maureen Curran1,1752.89%
|
|Marcella Williams1,2903.18%
|
|Martin Kendell (Ind.)2960.73%
||
|Jagmeet Singh
|-
| style="background-color:whitesmoke" |Coquitlam—Port Coquitlam
||
|Ron McKinnon21,45438.51%
|
|Katerina Anastasiadis16,90730.34%
|
|Laura Dupont14,98226.89%
|
|
|
|Kimberly Brundell2,3734.26%
|
|
||
|Ron McKinnon
|-
| style="background-color:whitesmoke" |New Westminster—Burnaby
|
|Rozina Jaffer11,68523.69%
|
|Paige Munro9,71019.69%
||
|Peter Julian24,05448.77%
|
|David Macdonald2,0354.13%
|
|Kevin Heide1,8403.73%
|
|
||
|Peter Julian
|-
| style="background-color:whitesmoke" |North Vancouver
||
|Jonathan Wilkinson26,75645.10%
|
|Les Jickling16,67128.10%
|
|Tammy Bentz11,75019.81%
|
|Archie Kaario2,5984.38%
|
|John Galloway1,5452.60%
|
|
||
|Jonathan Wilkinson
|-
| style="background-color:whitesmoke" |Port Moody—Coquitlam
|
|Will Davis14,23127.32%
|
|Nelly Shin16,60531.88%
||
|Bonita Zarrillo19,36737.18%
|
|
|
|Desta McPherson1,7663.39%
|
|Roland Verrier (M-L)1220.23%
||
|Nelly Shin
|-
|rowspan=3 style="background-color:whitesmoke" |West Vancouver—Sunshine Coast—Sea to Sky Country
|rowspan=3 |
|rowspan=3 |Patrick Weiler21,50033.88%
|rowspan=3 |
|rowspan=3 |John Weston19,06230.04%
|rowspan=3 |
|rowspan=3 |Avi Lewis16,26525.63%
|rowspan=3 |
|rowspan=3 |Mike Simpson4,1086.47%
|rowspan=3 |
|rowspan=3 |Doug Bebb2,2993.62%
|
|Terry Grimwood (Ind.)50 0.08%
|rowspan=3 |
|rowspan=3 |Patrick Weiler
|-
|
|Gordon Jeffrey (Rhino.)98 0.15%
|-
|
|Chris MacGregor (Ind.)77 0.12%
|}

Vancouver

|-
| style="background-color:whitesmoke" |Vancouver Centre
||
|Hedy Fry20,87340.44%
|
|Harry Cockell11,16221.62%
|
|Breen Ouellette15,86930.74%
|
|Alaric Paivarinta2,0303.93%
|
|Taylor Singleton-Fookes1,6833.26%
|
|
||
|Hedy Fry
|-
|rowspan=2 style="background-color:whitesmoke" |Vancouver East
|rowspan=2 |
|rowspan=2 |Josh Vander Vies9,79719.76%
|rowspan=2 |
|rowspan=2 |Mauro Francis5,39910.89%
|rowspan=2 |
|rowspan=2 |Jenny Kwan27,96956.40%
|rowspan=2 |
|rowspan=2 |Cheryl Matthew3,8267.72%
|rowspan=2 |
|rowspan=2 |Karin Litzcke1,3822.79%
|
|Gölök Buday (Libert.)831 1.68%
|rowspan=2 |
|rowspan=2 |Jenny Kwan
|-
|
|Natasha Hale (Comm.)387 0.78%
|-
| style="background-color:whitesmoke" |Vancouver Granville
||
|Taleeb Noormohamed17,05034.40%
|
|Kailin Che13,28026.80%
|
|Anjali Appadurai16,61933.53%
|
|Imtiaz Popat1,4342.89%
|
|Damian Jewett1,1772.37%
|
|
||
|Jody Wilson-Raybould†
|-
|rowspan=2 style="background-color:whitesmoke" |Vancouver Kingsway
|rowspan=2 |
|rowspan=2 |Virginia Bremner11,02227.45%
|rowspan=2 |
|rowspan=2 |Carson Binda5,45613.59%
|rowspan=2 |
|rowspan=2 |Don Davies20,99452.28%
|rowspan=2 |
|rowspan=2 |Farrukh Chishtie1,5753.92%
|rowspan=2 |
|rowspan=2 |Jeremy MacKenzie8682.16%
|
|Kimball Cariou (Comm.)175 0.44%
|rowspan=2 |
|rowspan=2 |Don Davies
|-
|
|Donna Petersen (M-L)68 0.17%
|-
| style="background-color:whitesmoke" |Vancouver Quadra
||
|Joyce Murray20,81443.63%
|
|Brad Armstrong13,78628.90%
|
|Naden Abenes9,22019.33%
|
|Devyani Singh2,9226.13%
|
|Renate Siekmann9632.02%
|
|
||
|Joyce Murray
|-
| style="background-color:whitesmoke" |Vancouver South
||
|Harjit S. Sajjan19,91049.43%
|
|Sukhbir Singh Gill9,06022.49%
|
|Sean McQuillan9,92224.63%
|
|
|
|Anthony Cook1,1042.74%
|
|Anne Jamieson (M-L)2870.71%
||
|Harjit Sajjan
|-
|}

Vancouver Island

|-
| style="background-color:whitesmoke" |Courtenay—Alberni
|
|Susan Farlinger9,27613.39%
|
|Mary Lee22,18132.03%
||
|Gord Johns30,61244.21%
|
|Susanne Lawson3,5905.18%
|
|Robert Eppich3,4675.01%
|
|Barbara Biley (M-L)1240.18%
||
|Gord Johns
|-
| style="background-color:whitesmoke" |Cowichan—Malahat—Langford
|
|Blair Herbert10,32016.37%
|
|Alana DeLong17,87028.35%
||
|Alistair MacGregor26,96842.78%
|
|Lia Versaevel3,9226.22%
|
|Mark Hecht3,9526.27%
|
|
||
|Alistair MacGregor
|-
| style="background-color:whitesmoke" |Esquimalt—Saanich—Sooke
|
|Doug Kobayashi14,46622.07%
|
|Laura Anne Frost13,88521.18%
||
|Randall Garrison28,05642.81%
|
|Harley Gordon5,8918.99%
|
|Rob Anderson2,9954.57%
|
|Tyson Riel Strandlund (Comm.)2490.38%
||
|Randall Garrison
|-
| style="background-color:whitesmoke" |Nanaimo—Ladysmith
|
|Michelle Corfield9,31413.54%
|
|Tamara Kronis18,62727.09%
||
|Lisa Marie Barron19,82628.83%
|
|Paul Manly17,64025.65%
|
|Stephen Welton3,3584.88%
|
|
||
|Paul Manly
|-
|rowspan=2 style="background-color:whitesmoke" |North Island—Powell River
|rowspan=2 |
|rowspan=2 |Jennifer Grenz7,92213.15%
|rowspan=2 |
|rowspan=2 |Shelley Downey21,67035.96%
|rowspan=2 |
|rowspan=2 |Rachel Blaney23,83339.55%
|rowspan=2 |
|rowspan=2 |Jessica Wegg3,6566.07%
|rowspan=2 |
|rowspan=2 |Paul Macknight2,7954.64%
|
|Stacey Gastis (Mav.)310 0.51%
|rowspan=2 |
|rowspan=2 |Rachel Blaney
|-
|
|Carla Neal (M-L)77 0.13%
|-
| style="background-color:whitesmoke" |Saanich—Gulf Islands
|
|Sherri Moore-Arbour12,05618.40%
|
|David Busch14,77522.55%
|
|Sabina Singh11,95918.25%
||
|Elizabeth May24,64837.62%
|
|David Hilderman1,9432.97%
|
|Dock Currie (Comm.)1410.22%
||
|Elizabeth May
|-
|rowspan=2 style="background-color:whitesmoke" |Victoria
|rowspan=2 |
|rowspan=2 |Nikki Macdonald18,19427.26%
|rowspan=2 |
|rowspan=2 |Hannah Hodson9,15213.71%
|rowspan=2 |
|rowspan=2 |Laurel Collins29,30143.90%
|rowspan=2 |
|rowspan=2 |Nick Loughton7,47211.19%
|rowspan=2 |
|rowspan=2 |John Randal Phipps2,0653.09%
|
|Jordan Reichert (Animal)273 0.41%
|rowspan=2 |
|rowspan=2 |Laurel Collins
|-
|
|Janis Zroback (Comm.)291 0.44%
|}

Nunavut

|-
| style="background-color:whitesmoke" |Nunavut
|
|Pat Angnakak2,57835.86%
|
|Laura Mackenzie1,18416.47%
||
|Lori Idlout3,42747.67%
||
|Mumilaaq Qaqqaq$
|}

Northwest Territories

|-
| style="background-color:whitesmoke" |Northwest Territories
||
|Michael McLeod5,38738.22%
|
|Lea Anne Mollison2,03114.41%
|
|Kelvin Kotchilea4,55832.34%
|
|Roland Laufer3282.33%
|
|Jane Groenewegen1,79112.71%
||
|Michael McLeod
|}

Yukon

|-
| style="background-color:whitesmoke" |Yukon
||
|Brendan Hanley6,47133.35%
|
|Barbara Dunlop5,09626.26%
|
|Lisa Vollans-Leduc4,35422.44%
|
|Lenore Morris8464.36%
|
|Jonas Jacot Smith2,63913.60%
||
|Larry Bagnell$
|}

Notes

References 

Candidates in the 2021 Canadian federal election
Canadian federal election results